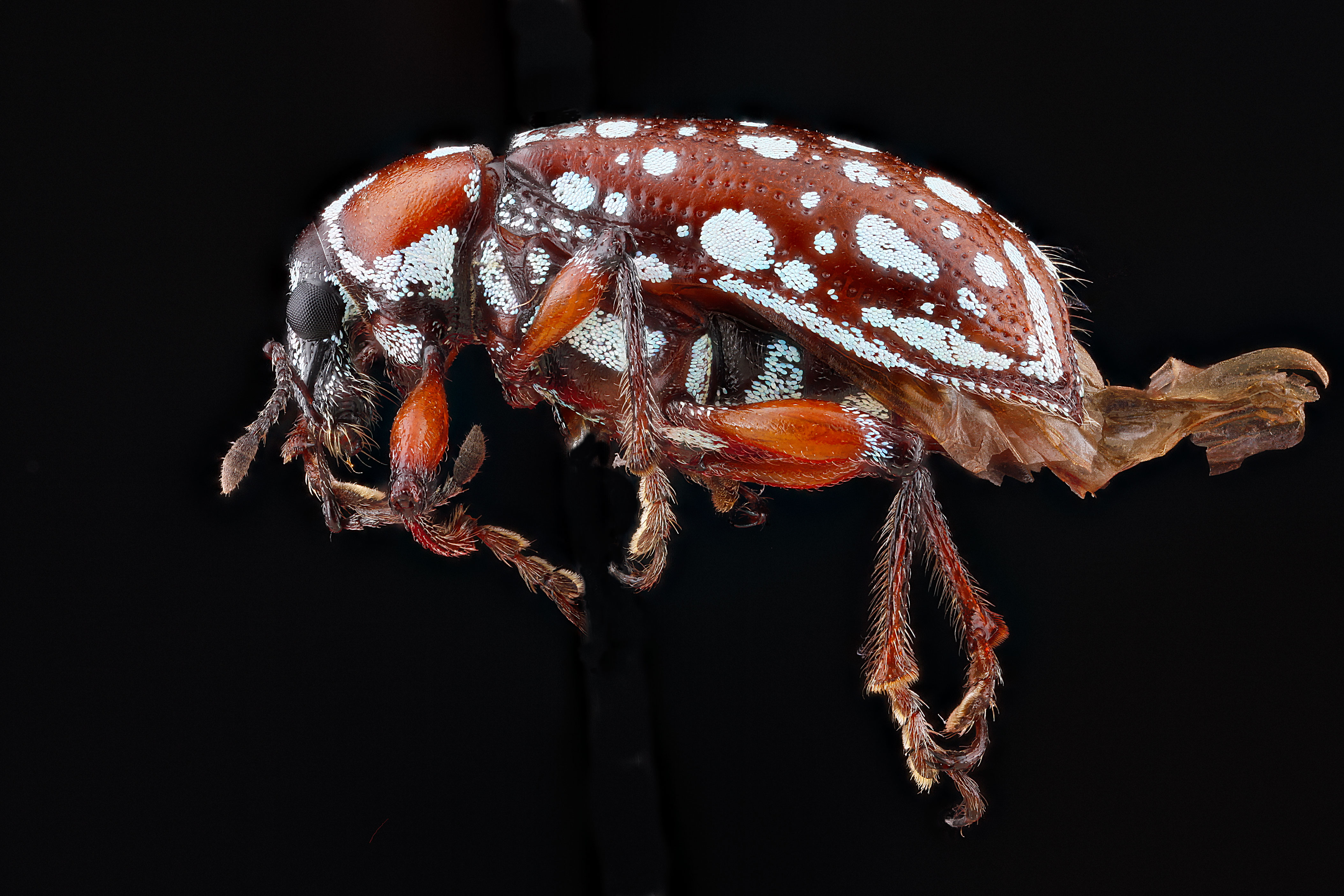
- Lachnopus guerinii

Scientific classification
- Kingdom: Animalia
- Phylum: Arthropoda
- Clade: Pancrustacea
- Class: Insecta
- Order: Coleoptera
- Suborder: Polyphaga
- Infraorder: Cucujiformia
- Superfamily: Curculionoidea
- Family: Curculionidae
- Subfamily: Entiminae
- Tribe: Geonemini
- Genus: Lachnopus; Schönherr, 1840

= Lachnopus =

Genus of insects

Lachnopus is a genus of broad-nosed weevils in the family Curculionidae distributed in the Caribbean Region.

== Taxonomy ==
The genus Lachnopus was named for the first time by Carl Johan Schönherr in 1840 (p. 380). The names Menoetius Dejean, 1821-94 and Ptilopus Schönherr, 1823: c. 1140 are considered junior synonyms of Lachnopus.

The placement of Lachnopus within Entiminae has been unstable through time. It was considered part of Lacordaire's "Cyphides" (p. 107, 122) along with some genera considered nowadays to be part of the tribe Eustylini (Compsus, Exophthalmus, Oxyderces, Tetrabothinus) or Naupactini ("Cyphus" -currently Cyrtomon-, Platyomus). Then considered among the Barynotini in van Emden (1944) and O'Brien and Wibmer (1982), a widespread assemblage of weevils which is now known as the Geonemini.

The identity of Lachnopus has been questioned, specifically regarding its distinctness from Exophthalmus. The status of Lachnopus as a separate genus was confirmed by Franz (2012).

Lachnopus is currently the most diverse and one of the most widespread groups of entiminae weevils in the Caribbean Region. Girón et al. (2018) recognized six species groups within the genus, partly based on results of a previous morphology-based phylogenetic study.

== Description ==
According to the key provided by van Emden (1944), some characters to recognize the genus Lachnopus are as follows:

Rostrum weakly and evenly convex throughout; antennal scape extending to, or slightly passing beyond middle of eye; frons between eyes conspicuously narrower than dorsal surface of rostrum; head not constricted posteriad of eyes; eyes only moderately convex; humeri only slightly wider than posterior margin of pronotum; femora unarmed; tibiae ventrally denticulate; and metatibial corbel lacking scales.

— van Emden, XLVII—A key to the genera of Brachyderinae of the World., p. 520

== Distribution ==
The genus Lachnopus ranges across the Caribbean Region, spanning the Lucayan Archipelago (The Bahamas plus the Turks and Caicos Islands), the Greater Antilles, the Cayman Islands, and Cozumel Island (Mexico).

== Species list ==
There are 73 Lachnopus species described to date:

- Lachnopus acunae de Zayas, 1988: 160: Cuba.
- Lachnopus acuticollis (Gyllenhal), 1834: 37: Cuba.
- Lachnopus aereus (Gyllenhal), 1834: 40: Hispaniola.
- Lachnopus alboguttatus Marshall, 1934: 622: Cuba.
- Lachnopus albomaculatus (Gyllenhal), 1834: 37: Haiti.
- Lachnopus argus (Reiche), 1840: 275: Cuba; Florida.
- Lachnopus atramentarius (Gyllenhal), 1834: 33: Dominican Republic, Haiti.
- Lachnopus aulicus (Gyllenhal), 1834: 35: Hispaniola.
- Lachnopus aurifer (Drury), 1773: 68: Cuba, Jamaica.
- Lachnopus bellus Marshall, 1926: 54: Haiti.
- Lachnopus bivirgatus Marshall, 1934: 621: Cuba.
- Lachnopus bruneri Marshall, 1933: 59: Cuba.
- Lachnopus buchanani Marshall, 1933: 59: Cuba.
- Lachnopus cabocruz de Zayas, 1988: 162: Cuba.
- Lachnopus campechianus Gyllenhal, 1840: 388: Guadeloupe.
- Lachnopus canescens Gyllenhal, 1840: 388: Hispaniola.
- Lachnopus chirographus (Olivier), 1807: 334: Hispaniola.
- Lachnopus chlorophanus (Gyllenhal), 1834: 39: Haiti.
- Lachnopus coffeae Marshall, 1922: 60: Puerto Rico
- Lachnopus consentaneus Perroud, 1853: 487 [103]: Hispaniola.
- Lachnopus cozumelus Girón & O’Brien, 2018: 7: Mexico (Cozumel).
- Lachnopus cristalensis de Zayas, 1988: 161: Cuba.
- Lachnopus curvipes (Fabricius), 1787: 113: Antigua, Barbuda, Dominica, Dominican Republic, Guana Island, Grenada, Guadeloupe, Jamaica, Montserrat, Nevis, Puerto Rico, Saint Barthélemy, Saint Croix, Saint John, Saint Kitts, Saint Thomas, Saint Vincent, Tobago, Tortola, Virgin Gorda.
- Lachnopus dentipes Perroud, 1853: 489 [105]: Hispaniola.
- Lachnopus distortus Gyllenhal, 1840: 393: West Indies.
- Lachnopus festivus de Zayas, 1988: 159: Cuba.
- Lachnopus floridanus Horn, 1876: 101: Florida.
- Lachnopus gowdeyi Marshall, 1926: 531: Jamaica.
- Lachnopus granicollis Gyllenhal, 1840: 390: Hispaniola.
- Lachnopus guerinii Jacqelin du Val, 1857: 185: Cuba.
- Lachnopus guttatupunctatus de Zayas 1988: 155: Cuba.
- Lachnopus hirtus Perroud, 1853: 484 [100]: Hispaniola.
- Lachnopus hispidus (Gyllenhal), 1834: 34: Cuba; Florida.
- Lachnopus histrio (Marshall), 1926: 534: Haiti.
- Lachnopus inconditus Rosenschoeld, 1840: 383: Dominican Republic.
- Lachnopus interruptus Perroud, 1853: 475 [91]: Hispaniola.
- Lachnopus karphos Girón & O’Brien, 2018: 10: The Bahamas.
- Lachnopus kofresi Wolcott, 1941: 104: Puerto Rico (Mona Island).
- Lachnopus leonorae de Zayas, 1988: 165: Cuba.
- Lachnopus lineatoguttatus Perroud, 1853: 468: Cuba.
- Lachnopus lineicollis (Chevrolat), 1880: 175: Dominica, Guadeloupe.
- Lachnopus lucayanus Girón & O’Brien, 2018: 14: The Bahamas.
- Lachnopus luctuosus (Klug), 1829: 13: Cuba.
- Lachnopus luxurians (Olivier), 1807: 334: Hispaniola.
- Lachnopus magdae de Zayas, 1988: 164: Cuba.
- Lachnopus mayari de Zayas, 1988: 156: Cuba.
- Lachnopus memnonius (Gyllenhal), 1834: 42: Saint Barthélemy.
- Lachnopus mercator (Olivier), 1807: 335: Haiti.
- Lachnopus multipunctatus Jacquelin du Val, 1857: 190: Cuba.
- Lachnopus mundus (Gyllenhal), 1834: 31: Dominican Republic.
- Lachnopus niveoirroratus Jacqelin du Val, 1857: 189: Cuba.
- Lachnopus oteroi Marshall, 1933: 60: Cuba.
- Lachnopus petilusquamus Girón & O’Brien, 2018: 18: The Bahamas.
- Lachnopus planifrons Gyllenhal, 1840: 385: Dominican Republic.
- Lachnopus plebejus (Gyllenhal), 1834: 23: Hispaniola.
- Lachnopus plumipes Perroud, 1853: 471 [87]: Dominican Republic, Haiti.
- Lachnopus pollinarius Gyllenhal, 1840: 387: Cuba.
- Lachnopus porcus de Zayas, 1988: 158: Cuba.
- Lachnopus proteus (Olivier), 1807: 13: Dominican Republic, Haiti.
- Lachnopus pruinosus (Gyllenhal), 1834: 33: Hispaniola.
- Lachnopus rhabdotus Girón & O’Brien, 2018: 22: Turks and Caicos Islands.
- Lachnopus seini Wolcott, 1936: 302: Puerto Rico.
- Lachnopus siboney de Zayas, 1988: 166: Cuba.
- Lachnopus sparsimguttatus Perroud, 1853: 481: Cuba.
- Lachnopus splendidus Boheman, 1840: 382: Cuba.
- Lachnopus spretus (Gyllenhal), 1834: 38: Dominican Republic.
- Lachnopus sublineatus Perroud, 1853: 478 [94]: Cuba.
- Lachnopus trilineatus Chevrolat, 1876: CCXXVIII: Puerto Rico.
- Lachnopus valgus (Fabricius), 1775: 150: Anguilla, Puerto Rico, Saint Barthélemy, Saint Croix, Saint John, Saint Martin.
- Lachnopus vanessablockae Girón & O’Brien, 2018: 25: Cayman Islands.
- Lachnopus villosipes (Boheman), 1834: 43: Saint Barthélemy; Sint Eustatius.
- Lachnopus vittatus (Klug), 1829: 13: Cuba
- Lachnopus yaucona Wolcott, 1936: 302: Puerto Rico.
