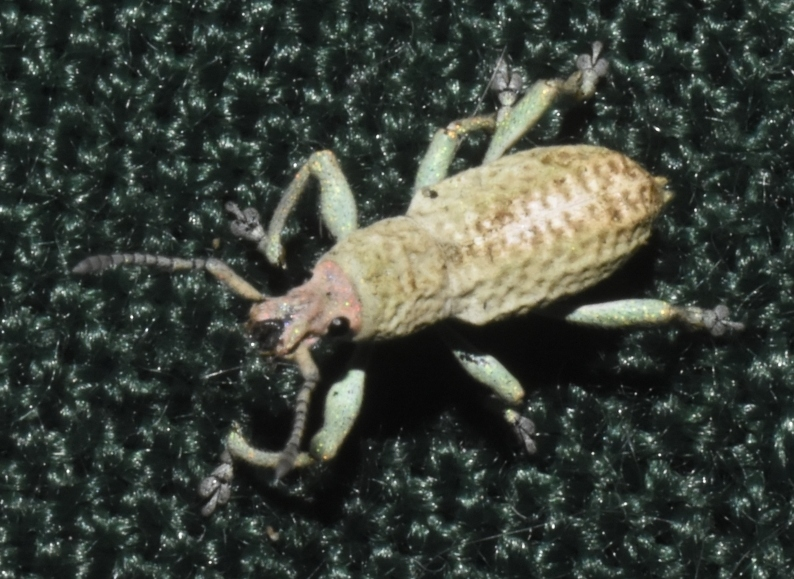
- Dorsal view of Oxyderces viridipes

Scientific classification
- Kingdom: Animalia
- Phylum: Arthropoda
- Class: Insecta
- Order: Coleoptera
- Suborder: Polyphaga
- Infraorder: Cucujiformia
- Family: Curculionidae
- Genus: Oxyderces
- Species: O. viridipes

Binomial name
- Oxyderces viridipes Boheman, 1840

Synonyms
- Platyomus viridipes; Compsus viridipes; Plococompsus viridipes

= Oxyderces viridipes =

Species of weevil

Oxyderces viridipes is a species of broad-nosed weevils in the family Curculionidae. This species is endemic to Colombia, commonly found in Medellín and surrounding areas, but has been incidentally collected in the United States.

== Taxonomy ==
Oxyderces viridipes was described for the first time by Carl Henrik Boheman in 1840, page 179, under the genus Platyomus. It belongs to the subfamily Entiminae, tribe Eustylini.

The taxonomic status of the species requires verification, since it can be easily confused with the genus Compsus.

The holotype for Oxyderces viridipes is housed at the Swedish Museum of Natural History (NHRS-JLKB000022891; identified as Compsus viridipes).

== Description ==
The original diagnosis, in Latin, offered by Boheman is as follows:

Oblongus, niger, squamulis laete virescentibus tectus, capite rostroque

cupreo-squamosis; fronte foveolata, rostro medio utrinque impresso;

thorace oblongo, dorso late parum profunde impresso, rude minus

crebre rugoso; elytris dorso depressis, sat profunde punctato-striatis,

interstitiis alternis modice elevatis, sutura late albo-squamosis, apice

ipso mucronatis, pedibus squamulis viridi-nitidis tectis.

— Boheman, Genera et species Curculionidum, cum synonymia hujus familae species novae., p. 179

According to this diagnosis, the species can be recognized by the following features: dense cover of green scales; head and rostrum with cupreous scales; frons with a fovea, rostrum medially depressed; pronotum slightly depressed medially, coarsely rugose; elytra dorsally flattened, with moderately marked elytral punctures, with alternate interstriae moderately elevated, sutural region covered by white scales and apices projected; legs covered by shiny green scales.

== Distribution ==
Oxyderces viridipes is endemic to Colombia. The type locality is Antioquia and there are plenty of records in iNaturalist from Medellín and surrounding municipalities.

The species has been both, intercepted at ports of entry and recorded in iNaturalist from the United States.
