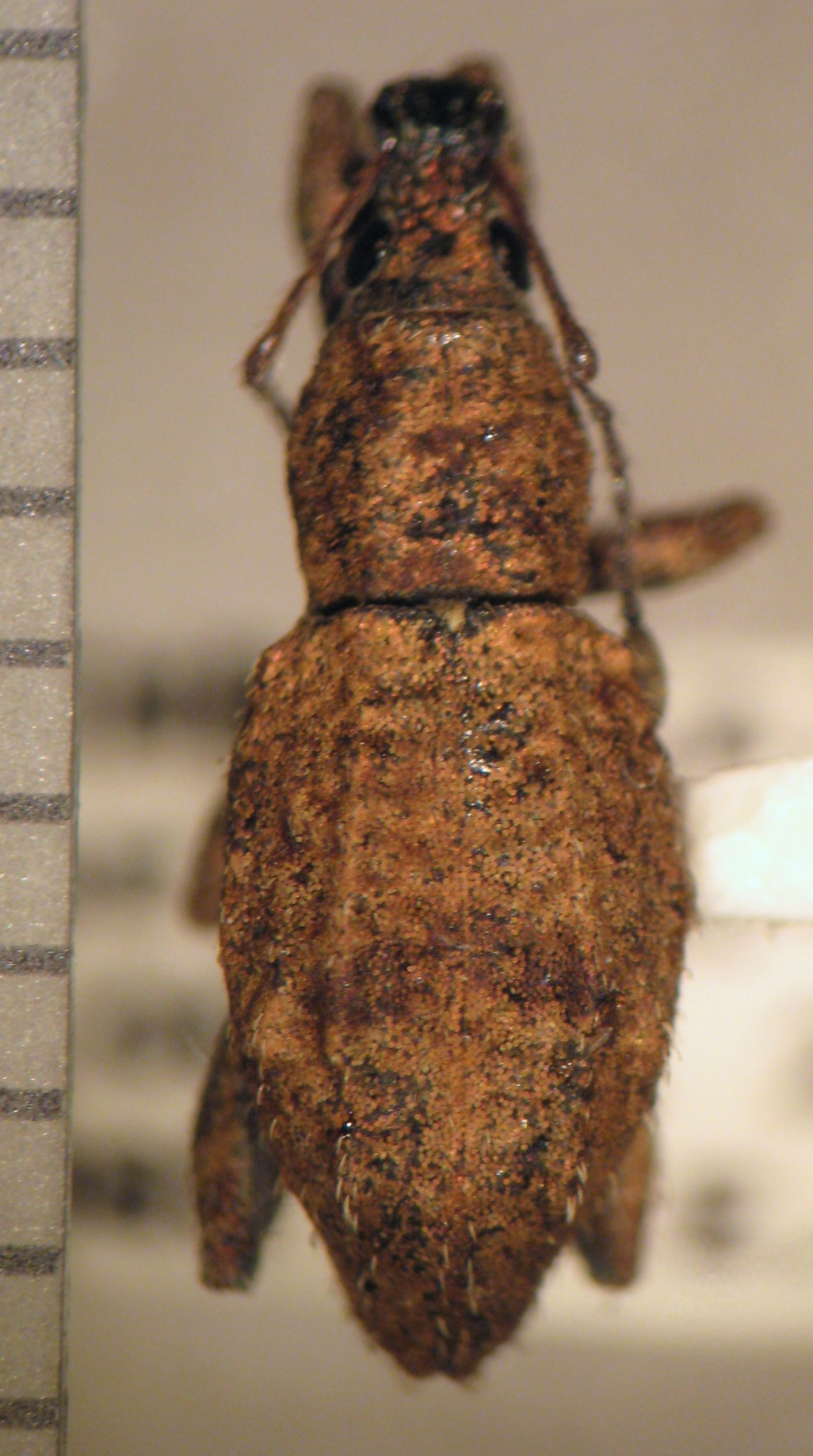
- Habitus of Synthlibonotus scapha

Scientific classification
- Domain: Eukaryota
- Kingdom: Animalia
- Phylum: Arthropoda
- Class: Insecta
- Order: Coleoptera
- Suborder: Polyphaga
- Infraorder: Cucujiformia
- Family: Curculionidae
- Tribe: Eustylini
- Genus: Synthlibonotus; Schönherr, 1847

= Synthlibonotus =

Genus of beetles

Synthlibonotus is a genus of broad-nosed weevils in the family Curculionidae distributed in northern South America.

== Taxonomy ==
Synthlibonotus belongs in the tribe Eustylini. It was described for the first time by Carl Johan Schönherr in 1847 (p. 41).

== Description ==
The genus Synthlibonotus was characterized by Schönherr as follows:

Antennae longiusculae, minus tenues; scapus oculos superans, sensim incrassatus, articulis duobus basalibus funiculi longiusculis, reliquis gradatim paullo brevioribus, omnibus obconicis; clava elongata, subovali.

Rostrum breviusculum, crassiusculum, subteres, apice paullo crassius.

Oculi rotundati, nonnihil convexi.

Elytia ovalia, basi truncata, dorso antice deplanata.

— Schönherr, Mantissa secunda familiae curculionidum., p. 41.

Synthlibonotus resembles some members of the genus Exophthalmus but can be distinguished by their long antennal scapes that reach beyond the anterior margin of the pronotum. The scale coverage can be relatively dense and uniform or essentially absent. There is noticeable sexual dimorphism, with females much broader than males.

== Distribution ==
Members of the genus Synthlibonotus can be found in Mexico, Guatemala, Colombia, and Venezuela.

== Species ==
The genus contains three described species:

- Synthlibonotus rufipes Schönherr, 1847: 41: Colombia, Venezuela.
- Synthlibonotus scapha Faust, 1892: 18: Venezuela.
- Synthlibonotus viator Chevrolat, 1880: XLII: Guatemala, Mexico.
