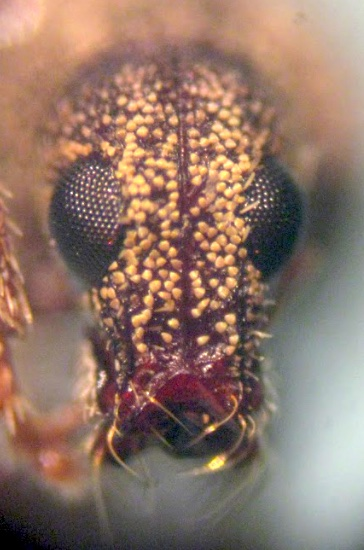
- Head of Polydacrys sp.

Scientific classification
- Domain: Eukaryota
- Kingdom: Animalia
- Phylum: Arthropoda
- Class: Insecta
- Order: Coleoptera
- Suborder: Polyphaga
- Infraorder: Cucujiformia
- Family: Curculionidae
- Subfamily: Entiminae
- Tribe: Anypotactini
- Genus: Polydacrys; Schönherr, 1834

= Polydacrys =

Genus of insects

Polydacrys is a genus of broad-nosed weevils in the beetle family Curculionidae, subfamily Entiminae, tribe Anypotactini, present across the Americas and the Caribbean. There are eight described species in Polydacrys.

== Taxonomy ==
Polydacrys was described for the first time by Carl Johan Schönherr in 1834 (p. 130). It was previously considered a member of the Tanymecini.

There is a key to the Central American species of Polydacrys in Champion (1911: 217).

== Description ==
Members of Polydacrys are small (~6 to 12 mm) and can be recognized by their nasal plate, which is triangular, large, glabrous, shiny, and elevated from the surface of the rostrum. In addition, their mandibular scars are projected from the surface of the mandible.

== Distribution ==
Members of Polydacrys range from Texas through Bolivia and are particularly well-represented across the Caribbean.

== Species ==
These eight species belong to the genus Polydacrys :

- Polydacrys bolivianus Voss, 1932: 36: Bolivia.
- Polydacrys brevicollis Champion, 1911: 215: Guatemala.
- Polydacrys depressifrons Boheman, 1840: 298 = Pandeletejus cavirostris Schaeffer, 1908: 214; = Pandeleteius nubilosus Boheman, 1840: 296: Texas, Belize, Costa Rica, El Salvador, Guatemala, Honduras, Mexico, Nicaragua, Panama, Grenada, Puerto Rico, Saint Vincent.
- Polydacrys moestus Chevrolat, 1880: 190 = Polydacrys nigrosparsus Chevrolat, 1880: 190: Guadeloupe.
- Polydacrys mucronatus Champion, 1911: 219: Costa Rica, Panama.
- Polydacrys nigrofasciatus Champion, 1911: 219: El Salvador, Mexico
- Polydacrys scansorius (Klug, 1829): 13 = Polydacrys modestus Gyllenhal, 1834: 131: Cuba, Dominica, Guadeloupe.
- Polydacrys seriegranosus Champion, 1911: 218: Panama, Bolivia, Colombia.
