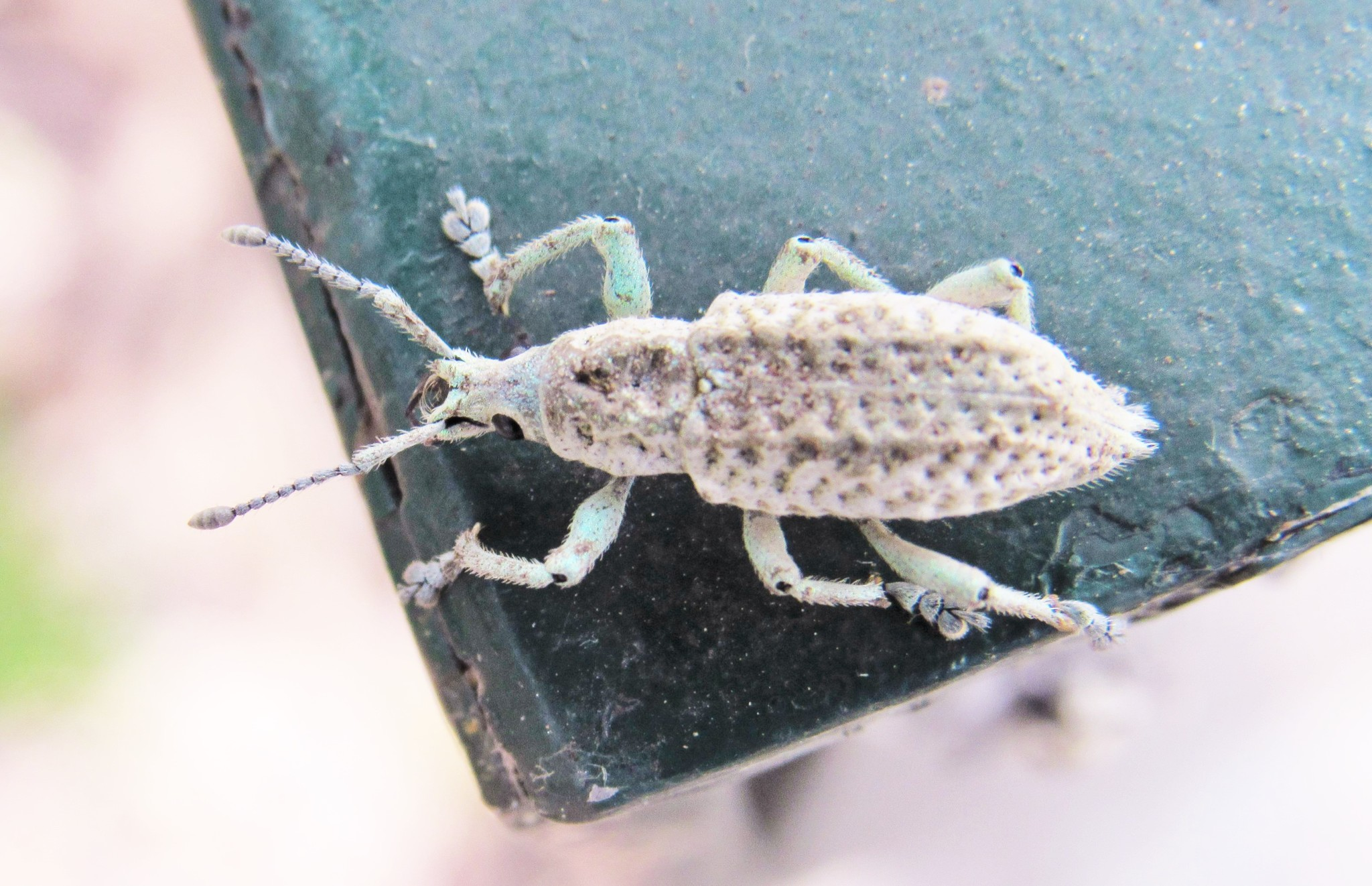
- Dorsal view of Compsus canescens

Scientific classification
- Domain: Eukaryota
- Kingdom: Animalia
- Phylum: Arthropoda
- Class: Insecta
- Order: Coleoptera
- Suborder: Polyphaga
- Infraorder: Cucujiformia
- Family: Curculionidae
- Genus: Compsus
- Species: C. canescens

Binomial name
- Compsus canescens Boheman, 1840

Synonyms
- Platyomus canescens

= Compsus canescens =

Species of broad-nosed weevil

Compsus canescens is a species of broad-nosed weevils in the family Curculionidae. This species is endemic to Colombia, commonly found in Bogotá and surrounding areas.

== Taxonomy ==
Compsus canescens was described for the first time by Carl Henrik Boheman in 1840, page 181, under the genus Platyomus. It belongs to the subfamily Entiminae, tribe Eustylini.

The holotype for Compsus canescens is housed at the Swedish Museum of Natural History (NHRS-JLKB000022893).

== Description ==
The original diagnosis, in Latin, offered by Boheman is as follows:

Oblongus, niger, breviter setulosus, supra squamulis canis lateribus et

subtus argenteis tectus, thorace profunde sat crebre rugoso, dorso

lato profunde lateribus obsoletius longitudinaliter impresso, antice

tenue canaliculato; elytris dorso depressis, sat profunde punctato-

striatis, interstitiis alternis elevatis, carinatis, apice breviter mucronatis.

— Boheman, Genera et species Curculionidum, cum synonymia hujus familae species novae., p. 181

According to this diagnosis, the species can be recognized by the following features: briefly setulose, grey/silver dorsal scales; pronotum depressed medially, coarsely rugose, with lateral longitudinal elevations; elytra dorsally flattened, with moderately marked elytral punctures, with alternate interstriae elevated, apices briefly projected.

== Distribution ==
Oxyderces viridipes is endemic to Colombia. The type locality is 'Nova Granata' and there are plenty of records in iNaturalist from Bogotá and surrounding municipalities.
