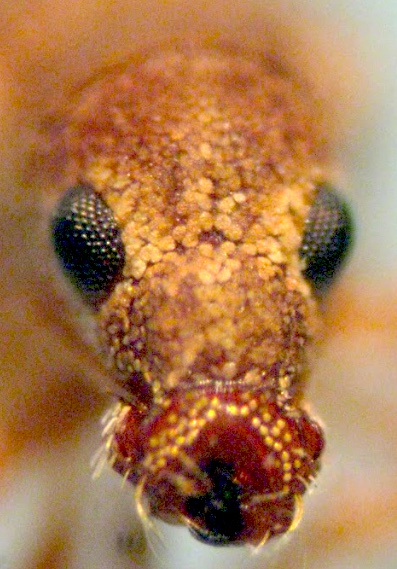
- Head of Anypotactus exilis

Scientific classification
- Kingdom: Animalia
- Phylum: Arthropoda
- Class: Insecta
- Order: Coleoptera
- Suborder: Polyphaga
- Infraorder: Cucujiformia
- Family: Curculionidae
- Subfamily: Entiminae
- Tribe: Anypotactini
- Genus: Anypotactus; Schönherr, 1840

= Anypotactus =

Genus of weevils found in Central and South America

Anypotactus is a genus of broad-nosed weevils in the beetle family Curculionidae, subfamily Entiminae, tribe Anypotactini, present across Central and South America. There are six described species in Anypotactus.

== Taxonomy ==
Anypotactus was described for the first time by Carl Johan Schönherr in 1840 (p. 299). The type species is Anypotactus exilis Boheman, 1840: 300.

== Description ==
Members of Anypotactus are small (~4 to 10 mm). The following characters are provided by van Emden to recognize Anypotactus:

Shoulders and wings present. Fore coxae contiguous. Mandibular scar not very large, not projecting. Rostrum separated from frons by a transverse groove. Femora toothed. Dorso-apical part of rostrum set off, rostrum rather short; nasal plate large and conspicuous.

— F. I. van Emden, A key to the genera of Brachyderinae of the World., p. 510, in key.

== Distribution ==
Members of Anypotactus range from Guatemala to Bolivia without representatives in the Caribbean.

== Species ==
These seven species belong to the genus Anypotactus:

- Anypotactus bicaudatus Champion, 1911: 215: Costa Rica, Panama.
- Anypotactus exilis Boheman, 1840: 300: Costa Rica, Guatemala, Honduras, Nicaragua, Panama, Colombia, Venezuela.
- Anypotactus gracilis Voss, 1932: 36 = Anypotactus curvipes Hustache, 1940: 272; = Anypotactus peruvianus Hustache, 1938: 265: Bolivia, Peru.
- Anypotactus jansoni (Sharp, 1911): Costa Rica, Honduras, Nicaragua, El Salvador
- Anypotactus morosus (Boheman), 1840: 449: Colombia,
- Anypotactus strangulatus Hustache, 1938: 266: Bolivia, Peru.
- Anypotactus sulcicollis Faust, 1892: 21: Venezuela.
