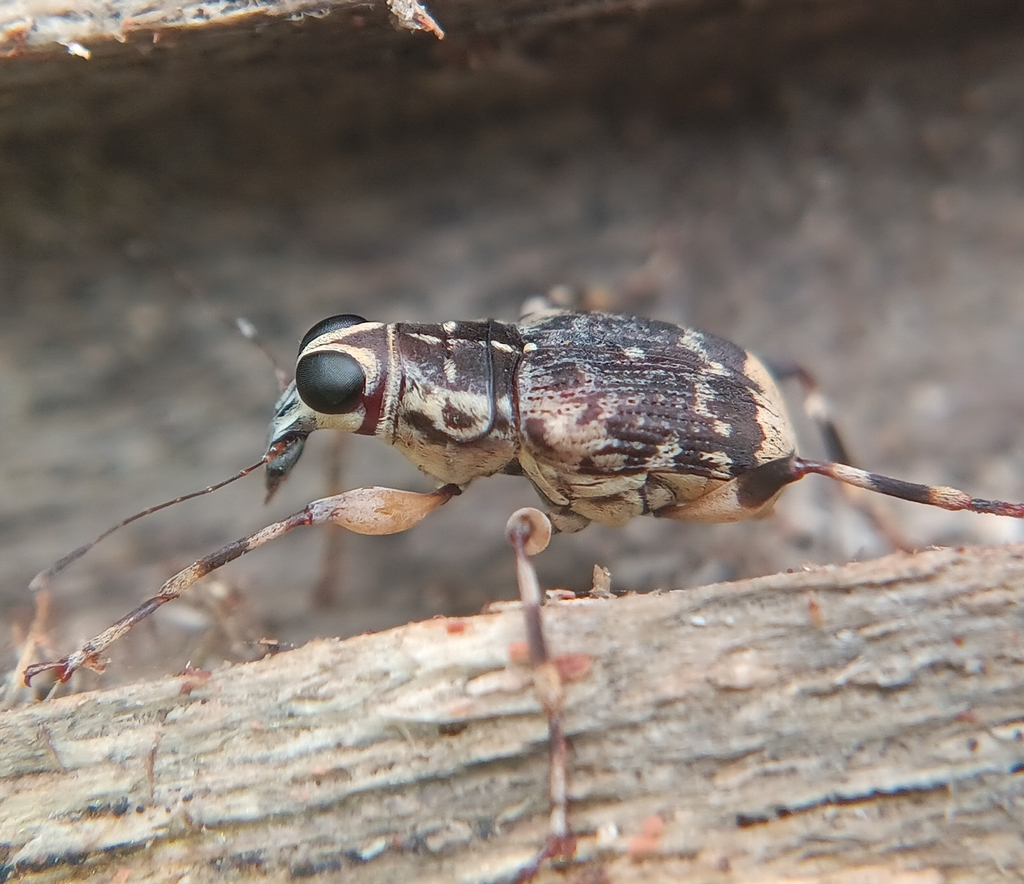
- Acorynus analis

Scientific classification
- Domain: Eukaryota
- Kingdom: Animalia
- Phylum: Arthropoda
- Class: Insecta
- Order: Coleoptera
- Suborder: Polyphaga
- Infraorder: Cucujiformia
- Family: Anthribidae
- Subfamily: Anthribinae
- Genus: Acorynus; C.J.Schoenherr, 1833

= Acorynus =

Genus of beetles

Acorynus is a large genus of weevils, described by Carl Johan Schönherr in 1833.

== Species ==
- Acorynus aemulus Jordan, 1926
- Acorynus alboguttatus Jordan, 1894
- Acorynus aliotarsalis Wolfrum, 1958
- Acorynus altilis Jordan, 1928
- Acorynus amabilis Pascoe, 1859
- Acorynus amaurus Wolfrum, 1949
- Acorynus anacis Jordan, 1926
- Acorynus analis Jordan, 1895
- Acorynus anatinus Jordan
- Acorynus anchis Jordan, 1912
- Acorynus angulifer (Walker, 1859)
- Acorynus angustefasciatus R.Frieser, 1989
- Acorynus anthinus Jordan, 1936
- Acorynus anthriboides Motschulsky, 1874
- Acorynus apatelus Jordan, 1925
- Acorynus apatenioides Jordan, 1895
- Acorynus apicalis Jordan, 1894
- Acorynus apicinotus Wolfrum, 1949
- Acorynus aratus Jordan, 1933
- Acorynus asanoi Nakane, 1978
- Acorynus aspersus Jordan, 1925
- Acorynus bacillosus Jordan, 1926
- Acorynus batjanensis Jordan, 1894
- Acorynus benitensis Jordan, 1903
- Acorynus bicornis Jordan, 1926
- Acorynus bifurcus Jordan, 1933
- Acorynus biguttatus Jordan, 1895
- Acorynus bimaculatus Kirsch, 1875
- Acorynus biplagiatus Jordan, 1894
- Acorynus bisphaericus R.Frieser, 1992
- Acorynus bothrinus Jordan, 1926
- Acorynus brevis Jordan, 1911
- Acorynus brunnipes R.Frieser, 2001
- Acorynus cadarus Jordan, 1911
- Acorynus caenonus Jordan, 1911
- Acorynus caffer Jordan, 1911
- Acorynus calcaratus Jordan, 1894
- Acorynus callistus Jordan, 1926
- Acorynus carinifrons Jordan, 1895
- Acorynus ceylonicus Jordan, 1894
- Acorynus cineraceus Jordan, 1895
- Acorynus cingalus Jordan, 1926
- Acorynus clathratus Jordan, 1897
- Acorynus cludus Jordan, 1895
- Acorynus coalitus Jordan, 1926
- Acorynus collaris Gyllenhal, 1833
- Acorynus confinis Jordan, 1928
- Acorynus conicus R.Frieser, 2001
- Acorynus conradti Jordan, 1901
- Acorynus coomani Jordan, 1928
- Acorynus cordiger Jordan, 1903
- Acorynus croceus Heller, 1919
- Acorynus cruralis Jordan, 1924
- Acorynus crux R.Frieser, 1975
- Acorynus cylindricus Jordan, 1894
- Acorynus detritus Jordan, 1915
- Acorynus dicyrtus Jordan, 1912
- Acorynus dilatifrons R.Frieser, 2001
- Acorynus diops Jordan, 1926
- Acorynus discicollis Jordan, 1897
- Acorynus disclusus Jordan, 1895
- Acorynus discoidalis Jordan, 1894
- Acorynus distichus Jordan, 1911
- Acorynus distinguendus Jordan, 1894
- Acorynus divergens (Pascoe, 1860)
- Acorynus divortus Jordan, 1933
- Acorynus dohertyi Jordan, 1926
- Acorynus drescheri Jordan, 1915
- Acorynus dryasis Jordan, 1942
- Acorynus emarginatus Jordan, 1895
- Acorynus energis Jordan, 1942
- Acorynus enganensis Jordan, 1897
- Acorynus eurous (Jordan, 1895)
- Acorynus expansus Jordan, 1928
- Acorynus fasciger Wolfrum, 1958
- Acorynus fenestratus Jordan, 1897
- Acorynus flavipunctum Jordan, 1911
- Acorynus frontalis Jordan, 1895
- Acorynus gitonus Jordan, 1911
- Acorynus gitosus Jordan, 1911
- Acorynus gracilentus Jordan, 1933
- Acorynus granulipennis R.Frieser, 1993
- Acorynus griseoniger Jordan, 1933
- Acorynus grisescens Jordan, 1894
- Acorynus guttatus Jordan, 1894
- Acorynus homospilus Jordan, 1911
- Acorynus imitans Wolfrum, 1958
- Acorynus jeanneli Jordan, 1915
- Acorynus labidus Jordan, 1924
- Acorynus laevicollis Jordan, 1895
- Acorynus latens Jordan, 1926
- Acorynus latirostris Shibata, 1963
- Acorynus leitensis Jordan, 1911
- Acorynus leptis Jordan, 1903
- Acorynus lewisi Jordan, 1903
- Acorynus ligatus Jordan, 1903
- Acorynus lineolatus Jordan, 1894
- Acorynus litigiosus (Pascoe, 1860)
- Acorynus luteago Jordan, 1926
- Acorynus luteus Jordan, 1903
- Acorynus luzonicus Jordan, 1895
- Acorynus malaisei Jordan, 1949
- Acorynus manifestus Jordan, 1928
- Acorynus marginellus Wolfrum, 1929
- Acorynus melanopus Jordan, 1903
- Acorynus mentawensis Jordan, 1897
- Acorynus mesotaenia Jordan, 1911
- Acorynus molitor Jordan, 1926
- Acorynus montanus Jordan, 1939
- Acorynus montosus Jordan, 1939
- Acorynus mosonicus Jordan, 1904
- Acorynus mundellus Jordan, 1926
- Acorynus musivus Jordan, 1926
- Acorynus nemoris Jordan, 1942
- Acorynus nessiarops Jordan, 1911
- Acorynus neuricus Jordan, 1926
- Acorynus niasicus Jordan, 1926
- Acorynus nigrans Jordan, 1933
- Acorynus nigrinus Jordan, 1926
- Acorynus obliquus Jordan, 1897
- Acorynus oceani Jordan, 1923
- Acorynus olivaceus Jordan, 1894
- Acorynus pachys Jordan, 1911
- Acorynus pais Jordan, 1911
- Acorynus pallipes Jordan, 1895
- Acorynus pardus Jordan, 1895
- Acorynus paris Jordan, 1922
- Acorynus parvulus Jordan, 1894
- Acorynus passerinus (Pascoe, 1860)
- Acorynus peosinus Jordan, 1926
- Acorynus phebus Jordan, 1927
- Acorynus picturatus Jordan, 1895
- Acorynus pictus Pascoe, 1860
- Acorynus poecilus Shibata, 1963
- Acorynus punctatus Jordan, 1894
- Acorynus punctipennis Jordan, 1895
- Acorynus quadripartitus Heller, 1919
- Acorynus rantus Jordan, 1911
- Acorynus ravidus Jordan, 1922
- Acorynus retusus Jordan, 1926
- Acorynus rhodius Jordan, 1903
- Acorynus rufus Jordan, 1894
- Acorynus rusticus Pascoe, 1859
- Acorynus salvazai Jordan, 1925
- Acorynus samaranus Jordan, 1898
- Acorynus saphis Jordan, 1933
- Acorynus saxidius Jordan, 1926
- Acorynus scalaris Jordan, 1911
- Acorynus scitinus Jordan, 1926
- Acorynus scobis Jordan, 1928
- Acorynus semistriatus R.Frieser, 1996
- Acorynus siamensis Jordan, 1926
- Acorynus silvanus Jordan, 1925
- Acorynus similis Jordan, 1894
- Acorynus simulatus Jordan, 1894
- Acorynus singularis Shibata, 1963
- Acorynus sinuatus Jordan, 1926
- Acorynus slamatus Jordan, 1931
- Acorynus solutus Jordan, 1949
- Acorynus sporadis Jordan, 1903
- Acorynus stramineus Jordan, 1926
- Acorynus striolatus Jordan, 1894
- Acorynus subdolus Jordan, 1926
- Acorynus subtinctus R.Frieser, 1975
- Acorynus sulcicollis Jordan, 1897
- Acorynus sulcirostris Boheman, 1833
- Acorynus teuches Jordan, 1933
- Acorynus tolianus Jordan, 1903
- Acorynus tonkinianus Jordan, 1904
- Acorynus transiens Jordan, 1897
- Acorynus transmaritimus R.Frieser, 1991
- Acorynus trilineatus Jordan, 1933
- Acorynus triplaris Jordan, 1926
- Acorynus trivittatus Jordan, 1897
- Acorynus tuberculata Kolbe, 1894
- Acorynus umbrinus R.Frieser, 2001
- Acorynus uniformis Jordan, 1922
- Acorynus validus Jordan, 1926
- Acorynus velatus Jordan, 1926
- Acorynus vergens Jordan, 1926
- Acorynus vicinus Jordan, 1915
- Acorynus vitticollis Jordan, 1911
- Acorynus wallacei Jordan, 1926
- Acorynus whiteheadi Jordan, 1898
- Acorynus xanthurus Jordan, 1911
- Acorynus ypsilon Jordan, 1926
- Acorynus zonatus Jordan, 1926
