= Compsus elegans =

Scientific classification
- Domain: Eukaryota
- Kingdom: Animalia
- Phylum: Arthropoda
- Class: Insecta
- Order: Coleoptera
- Suborder: Polyphaga
- Infraorder: Cucujiformia
- Family: Curculionidae
- Genus: Compsus
- Species: C. elegans

Binomial name
- Compsus elegans Lona, C., 1938

Species of beetle

Compsus elegans is a species of weevil in the tribe Eustylini.
