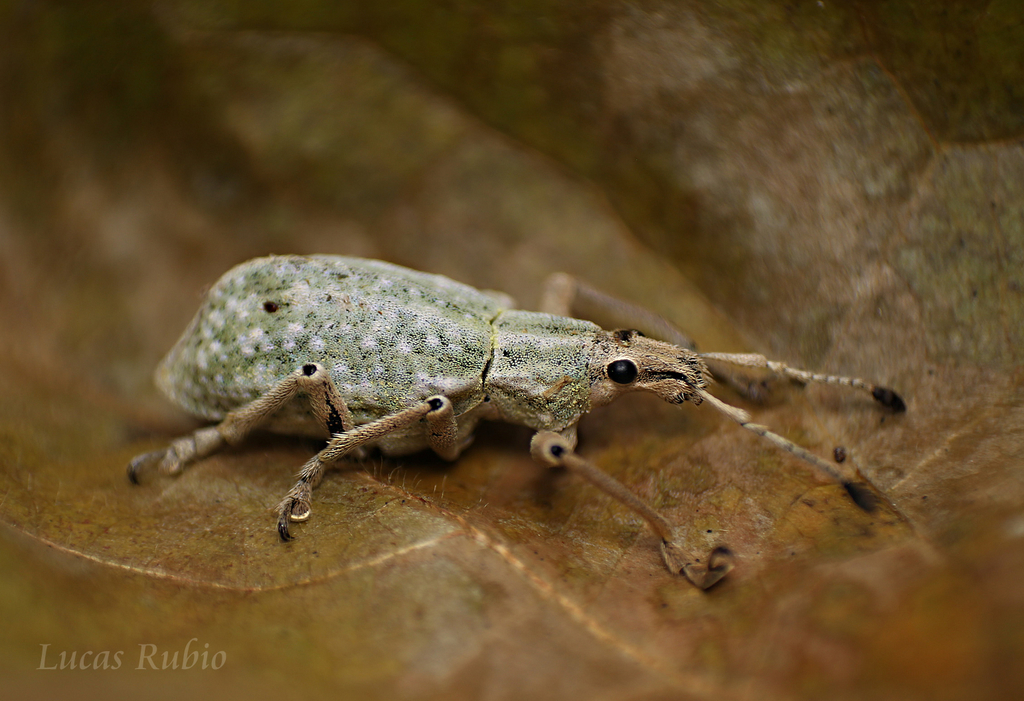
- Lateral view of Cyrtomon gibber

Scientific classification
- Domain: Eukaryota
- Kingdom: Animalia
- Phylum: Arthropoda
- Class: Insecta
- Order: Coleoptera
- Suborder: Polyphaga
- Infraorder: Cucujiformia
- Family: Curculionidae
- Tribe: Naupactini
- Genus: Cyrtomon; Schönherr, 1823

= Cyrtomon =

Genus of insects

Cyrtomon is a genus of broad-nosed weevils in the beetle family Curculionidae, present only in South America. There are six described species in Cyrtomon.

== Taxonomy ==
Cyrtomon was named for the first time by Carl Johan Schönherr in 1823 (p. 299). The type species is Curculio gibber Pallas, 1781: 32. The names Cyphus Germar, 1824: 427 and Neocyphus Bedel, 1883: 23 are junior synonyms of Cyrtomon.

The genus was revised by Analía Lanteri in 1990. Additional cladistics analyses involving Cyrtomon are presented in Lanteri and del Río (2016), which support the monophyly of the genus.

== Description ==
Members of Cyrtomon are mid-sized (12–24 mm) and can be recognized by their dense and uniform scale coverage, which is grey to green or brown in coloration. Their elytral shoulders are well developed.

Lanteri provides the following diagnosis for Cyrtomon:

Antenito 2 poco más largo que el 1. Mentón del labio provisto de largas setas. Ojos convexos. Base elitral bisinuada; hombros oblicuos muy salientes. [...] Especies de 14-24mm. Revestimiento de color verde, ceniza o castaño, compuesto por escamas redondas, generalmente superpuestas y setas escamiformes decumbentes.

— A.A. Lanteri, Revisión sistemática del género Cyrtomon Schönherr (Coleoptera, Curculionidae), p. 389.

== Distribution ==
Members of Cyrtomon can be found in Argentina, Bolivia, Brazil, Paraguay, and Uruguay.

== Species ==
Six species are currently recognized:

- Cyrtomon gibber (Pallas, 1781): 32: Brazil.
- Cyrtomon glaucus Bovie, 1907: 326: Argentina, Uruguay.
- Cyrtomon inhalatus Germar, 1824: 430: Argentina, Bolivia, Brazil, Uruguay.
- Cyrtomon luridus (Boheman, 1840): 144: Argentina, Brazil, Paraguay.
- Cyrtomon ovalipennis Hustache, 1938: 95: Argentina.
- Cyrtomon pistor (Boheman, 1833): 621: Brazil.
