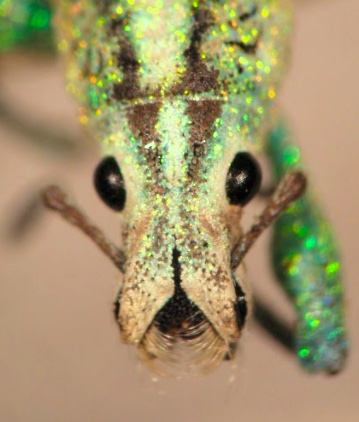
- Head of Oxyderces sp.

Scientific classification
- Kingdom: Animalia
- Phylum: Arthropoda
- Clade: Pancrustacea
- Class: Insecta
- Order: Coleoptera
- Suborder: Polyphaga
- Infraorder: Cucujiformia
- Family: Curculionidae
- Subfamily: Entiminae
- Tribe: Eustylini
- Genus: Oxyderces; Schönherr, 1823

= Oxyderces =

Genus of beetles

Oxyderces is a genus of broad-nosed weevils in the family Curculionidae distributed in South America. It can be recognized by the presence of dense setae on the apex of the rostrum and postocular setae.

== Taxonomy ==
The genus was named for the first time by Carl Johan Schönherr in 1823 in column 1140. It belongs to the subfamily Entiminae, tribe Eustylini.

It belongs to the so-called "Compsus genus complex". It has been proposed that Oxyderces is a synonym of Compsus.

== Description ==
In 1922 Sir Guy A. K. Marshall described the genus Plococompsus, which is currently a synonym of Oxyderces. This reference presents a good diagnosis for the genus:

This genus is proposed for a small homogeneous group of species of Compsus that are characterised especially by the presence of postocular vibrissae on the prothorax. Other characters are as follows: Scrobes narrow, curved downwards, but the upper edge attaining about the middle of the eye, so that the scape at rest passes across the lower half of the eye; the bare part of the scrobe not sharply defined, but gradually clothed with scales behind; epistomal setae very long and dense; scape not or only slightly exceeding the eye, comparatively slender, clavate, squamose, with the scales not overlapping; mentum with a group of setae on each side; insects with functional wings.

— Guy A. K. Marshall, VI. On new genera and species of Neotropical Curculionidae., p. 201

== Distribution ==
Oxyderces is known from Argentina, Bolivia, Brazil, Colombia, Ecuador, Paraguay, Peru, Venezuela; Guadeloupe, Martinique.

== Species list ==
The following species have been assigned to this genus:

- Oxyderces argentinicus (Heller, 1921: 28): Argentina.
- Oxyderces bimaculatus (Hustache, 1923: 290): Argentina, Bolivia.
- Oxyderces cinereus (Hustache, 1938: 110): Ecuador.
- Oxyderces cretaceus (Fabricius, 1792: 452): Guadeloupe, Martinique.
- Oxyderces croesus (Faust, 1892: 11): Venezuela.
- Oxyderces dubius (Voss, 1932: 40): Paraguay.
- Oxyderces euchloris (Pascoe, 1880): Peru.
- Oxyderces exaratus (Hustache, 1938: 111): Colombia.
- Oxyderces mansuetus Hustache, 1938: 109: Argentina.
- Oxyderces mirandus (Pascoe, 1880: 423): Colombia, Ecuador. [synonyms: Oxyderces cicatricosus (Hustache, 1938), Oxyderces nigroundulatus (Hustache, 1938), Oxyderces texatus (Hustache, 1938)]
- Oxyderces sinuatocostatus (Hustache, 1938: 112): Brazil.
- Oxyderces tarapotae (Hustache, 1938: 113): Peru.
- Oxyderces viridiaeris (Hustache, 1938: 115): Colombia.
- Oxyderces viridipes (Boheman, 1840): Colombia.
