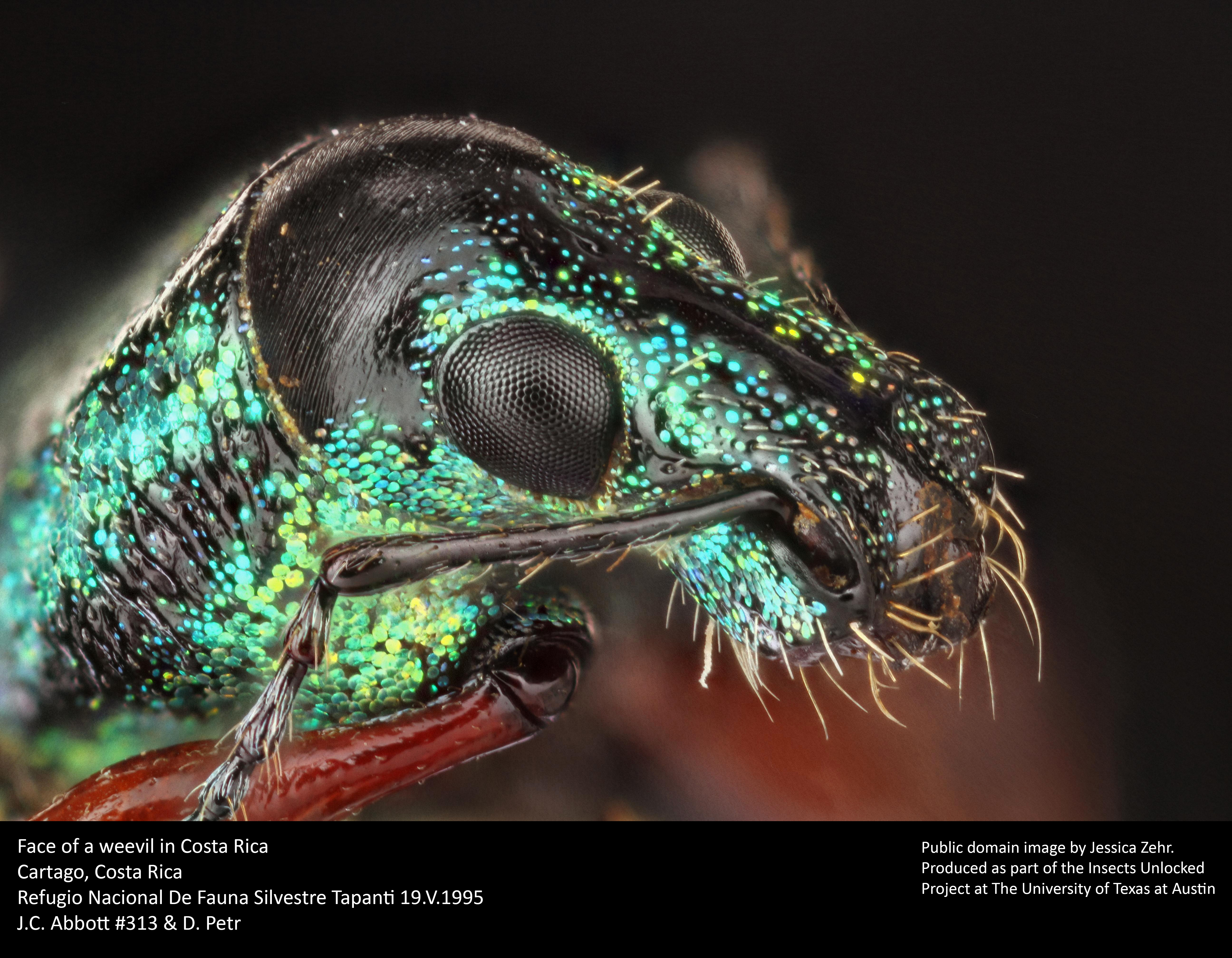
- Exophthalmus sp.

Scientific classification
- Domain: Eukaryota
- Kingdom: Animalia
- Phylum: Arthropoda
- Class: Insecta
- Order: Coleoptera
- Suborder: Polyphaga
- Infraorder: Cucujiformia
- Family: Curculionidae
- Subfamily: Entiminae
- Genus: Exophthalmus; Schönherr, 1823

= Exophthalmus =

Genus of broad-nosed weevils

Exophthalmus is a genus of broad-nosed weevils in the family Curculionidae. It contains 85 described species.

== Taxonomy ==
Exophthalmus was named for the first time by Carl Johan Schönherr in 1823 (column 1140). It belongs in the tribe Eustylini.

In revising the Jamaican species, Vaurie offers an overview to the genus and its taxonomic conflicts. A preliminary phylogeny for Exophthalmus and its allies was presented by Franz. It is part of the so-called "Exophthalmus genus complex" which involves members of the genera Diaprepes, Compsus, Lachnopus, among others. Based on morphological and molecular evidence, it has been proposed that the genus needs to be reclassified to better reflect the actual distribution of natural clades.

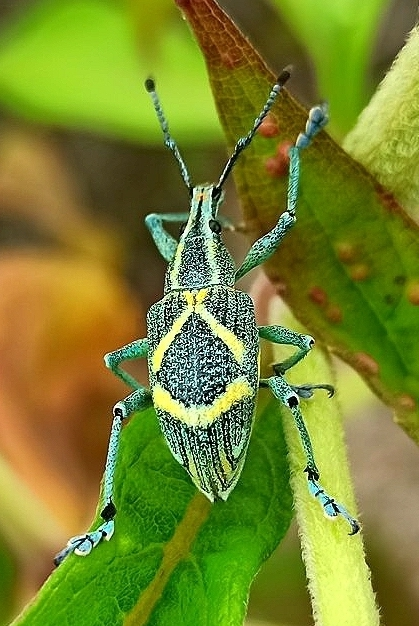
Dorsal view of Exophthalmus parentheticus in the field in Ecuador. By Diego Inclan

== Description ==
In general, Exophthalmus species are characterized by the smooth and broad longitudinal bridge running longitudinally across the rostrum. There is a lot of variation in sizes, density, coloration, and patterning of the scale coverage.

== Distribution ==
Species of this genus are present in Central America, northern South America and the Caribbean.

== Selected species ==
1. Exophthalmus agrestis (Boheman, 1834): 291: Mexico, Paraguay.
2. Exophthalmus albidus Champion, 1911: 255: Mexico.
3. Exophthalmus albofasciatus (Champion, 1911): 180: Honduras.
4. Exophthalmus albolineatus Champion, 1911: 262: Mexico.
5. Exophthalmus albosquamosus (Sallé, 1855): 268: Dominican Republic.
6. Exophthalmus albovittatus Champion, 1911: 263: Guatemala.
7. Exophthalmus annulonotatus Waterhouse, 1879: 423: Colombia, Ecuador.
8. Exophthalmus aurarius (Gyllenhal, 1834): 12: Guadeloupe.
9. Exophthalmus bilineatus Champion, 1911: 265: Guatemala.
10. Exophthalmus caeruleovittatus Champion, 1911: 264: Guatemala.
11. Exophthalmus carinirostris (Boheman, 1840): 187: Guatemala, Mexico, Nicaragua.
12. Exophthalmus carneipes Champion, 1911: 257: Costa Rica, Honduras, Panama.
13. Exophthalmus chrysopus Chevrolat, 1880: 165: Dominican Republic, Haiti.
14. Exophthalmus cinerascens (Fabricius, 1792): 452: Hispaniola, French Guiana.
15. Exophthalmus clathratus Champion, 1911: 264: Mexico.
16. Exophthalmus consobrinus (Marshall, 1922): 190: Colombia.
17. Exophthalmus costatus (Gyllenhal, 1834): 18: Hispaniola.
18. Exophthalmus crassicornis Kirsch, 1868: 238: Panama, Colombia.
19. Exophthalmus cupreipes Champion, 1911: 257: Mexico.
20. Exophthalmus cuprirostris Champion, 1911: 247: Costa Rica.
21. Exophthalmus depressicollis (Gyllenhal, 1834): 22: Hispaniola.
22. Exophthalmus distigma Champion, 1911: 259: Guatemala.
23. Exophthalmus dufaui (Hustache, 1929): 198: Guadeloupe.
24. Exophthalmus duplicatus Champion, 1911: 263: Mexico.
25. Exophthalmus farr Vaurie, 1961: 35: Jamaica.
26. Exophthalmus fasciatus Champion, 1911: 252: Mexico.
27. Exophthalmus foveicollis (Chevrolat, 1880): 175: Guadeloupe.
28. Exophthalmus frenatus (Marshall, 1934): 624: Dominican Republic, Haiti.
29. Exophthalmus gundlachi Chevrolat, 1880: 165: Cuba.
30. Exophthalmus haitiensis Bovie, 1907: 68: Haiti.
31. Exophthalmus hemigrammus (Chevrolat, 1880): 197: Martinique.
32. Exophthalmus hieroglyphicus Chevrolat, 1879: XCVII: Hispaniola.
33. Exophthalmus humeridens (Marshall, 1934): 623: Cuba.
34. Exophthalmus humilis (Gyllenhal, 1834): 28: Brazil.
35. Exophthalmus hybridus (Chevrolat, 1858): 210: Cuba.
36. Exophthalmus impositus (Pascoe, 1880): 427: Costa Rica, Nicaragua.
37. Exophthalmus impressus (Fabricius, 1781): 192: Jamaica.
38. Exophthalmus inaequalis (Gyllenhal, 1834): 23: Hispaniola.
39. Exophthalmus interpositus Champion, 1911: 253: Mexico.
40. Exophthalmus interruptus (Chevrolat, 1880): 165: Guadeloupe.
41. Exophthalmus jekelianus (White, 1858): 357: Costa Rica, Nicaragua, Panama, Colombia.
42. Exophthalmus laetus (Olivier, 1807): 326: Dominican Republic, Haiti.
43. Exophthalmus lepidus (Chevrolat, 1858): 210: Cuba.
44. Exophthalmus leucographus (Gyllenhal, 1834): 19: Hispaniola.
45. Exophthalmus lunaris Champion, 1911: 266: Belize, Guatemala, Mexico.
46. Exophthalmus maculosus Chevrolat, 1879: XCVIII: Cuba.
47. Exophthalmus mannerheimi Boheman, 1840: 338: Dominican Republic, Haiti.
48. Exophthalmus margaritaceus Champion, 1911: 255: Honduras, Nicaragua.
49. Exophthalmus marginicollis (Chevrolat, 1880): 175: Guadeloupe.
50. Exophthalmus marmoreus (Gyllenhal, 1840): 352: Guadeloupe.
51. Exophthalmus martinicensis Chevrolat, 1879: XCVIII: Martinique.
52. Exophthalmus mixtus Chevrolat, 1880: 165: Cuba.
53. Exophthalmus murinus (Rosenschoeld, 1840): 354: Suriname.
54. Exophthalmus nicaraguensis Bovie, 1907: 327: Costa Rica, Nicaragua, Panama.
55. Exophthalmus nubilus (Rosenschoeld, 1840): 355: Mexico.
56. Exophthalmus obsoletus (Olivier, 1807): 325: Haiti.
57. Exophthalmus opulentus (Boheman, 1840): 365: Guatemala, Mexico.
58. Exophthalmus ornatus Champion, 1911: 253: Guatemala.
59. Exophthalmus parentheticus (Marshall, 1922): 191: Ecuador.
60. Exophthalmus pictus (Guérin-Méneville, 1847): 9: Cuba.
61. Exophthalmus plicatus Champion, 1911: 268: Panama.
62. Exophthalmus pugnax (Olivier, 1807): 349: Haiti.
63. Exophthalmus pulchellus Boheman, 1834: 5: South America.
64. Exophthalmus pulverulentus (Champion, 1911): 180: Nicaragua.
65. Exophthalmus quadrivittatus (Olivier, 1807): 325: Dominican Republic, Haiti.
66. Exophthalmus quindecimpunctatus (Olivier, 1807): 300: Puerto Rico.
67. Exophthalmus roralis (Boheman, 1840): 356: Mexico.
68. Exophthalmus roseipes (Chevrolat, 1876): CCXXVII: Puerto Rico.
69. Exophthalmus scalaris (Boheman, 1840): 349: Costa Rica, Cuba.
70. Exophthalmus scalptus Champion, 1911: 259: Costa Rica.
71. Exophthalmus similis (Drury, 1773): pl. XXXIII: Jamaica.
72. Exophthalmus sphacelatus (Olivier, 1807): 319: Cuba, Dominican Republic, Haiti, Jamaica, Puerto Rico.
73. Exophthalmus squamipennis Gemminger, 1871: 119: Hispaniola.
74. Exophthalmus sulcicrus Champion, 1911: 268: Costa Rica, Guatemala, Nicaragua, Panama, Colombia.
75. Exophthalmus sulcipennis Champion, 1911: 265: Guatemala.
76. Exophthalmus sulphuratus Chevrolat, 1879: XCVII: Cuba.
77. Exophthalmus tessellatus Champion, 1911: 262: Costa Rica.
78. Exophthalmus triangulifer Champion, 1911: 261: Costa Rica, Panama.
79. Exophthalmus verecundus (Chevrolat, 1833): 16: El Salvador, Mexico.
80. Exophthalmus vermiculatus Champion, 1911: 264: Mexico.
81. Exophthalmus viridilineatus Champion, 1911: 266: Panama.
82. Exophthalmus viridipupillatus (Cockerell, 1893): 374: Jamaica.
83. Exophthalmus vitraci (Fleutiaux & Sallé, 1889): 380: Guadeloupe.
84. Exophthalmus vittatus (Linnaeus, 1758): 380: Jamaica.
85. Exophthalmus vitticollis Champion, 1911: 256: Belize, Guatemala.
