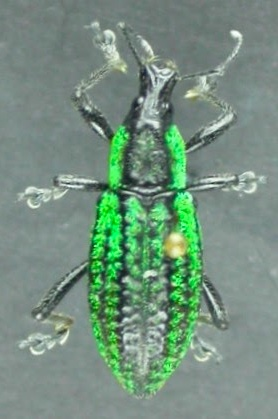
- Dorsal view of Xestogaster spp.

Scientific classification
- Kingdom: Animalia
- Phylum: Arthropoda
- Clade: Pancrustacea
- Class: Insecta
- Order: Coleoptera
- Suborder: Polyphaga
- Infraorder: Cucujiformia
- Family: Curculionidae
- Tribe: Eustylini
- Genus: Xestogaster; Marshall, 1922

= Xestogaster =

Genus of insects

Xestogaster is a South American genus of broad-nosed weevils in the family Curculionidae.

== Taxonomy ==
The genus was described by Sir Guy A. K. Marshall in 1922 (p. 221).

== Species ==
Xestogaster contains four recognized species:

1. Xestogaster mucorea (Kirsch, 1889) – Peru
2. Xestogaster porosa (Marshall, 1922) – Colombia
3. Xestogaster squalida (Marshall, 1922) – Colombia
4. Xestogaster viridilimbata (Bovie, 1907) – Brazil

== Description ==
Members of the genus Xestogaster are similar to members of the genera Exorides and Compsus.

According to Marshall:

The members of this genus can be distinguished from all their allies by the mesosternal tubercle and the highly polished venter.

— Guy A. K. Marshall, VI. On new genera and species of Neotropical Curculionidae., p. 221.

== Distribution ==
The genus Xestogaster is distributed in Brazil, Colombia, and Peru.
