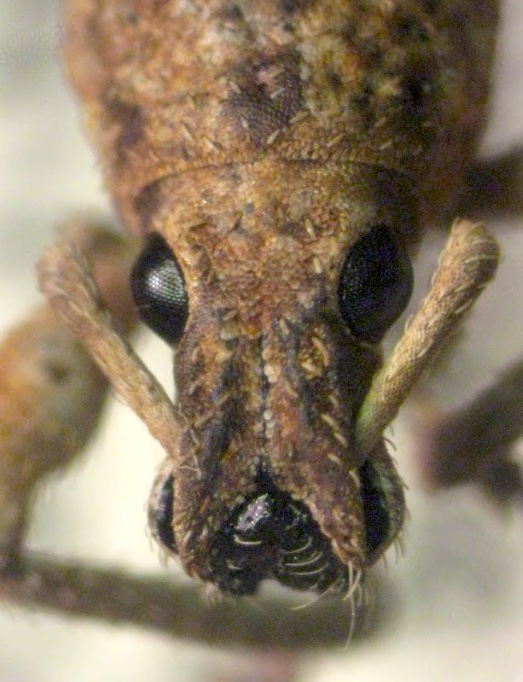
- Head of Brachyomus octotuberculatus

Scientific classification
- Kingdom: Animalia
- Phylum: Arthropoda
- Class: Insecta
- Order: Coleoptera
- Suborder: Polyphaga
- Infraorder: Cucujiformia
- Family: Curculionidae
- Subfamily: Entiminae
- Tribe: Eustylini
- Genus: Brachyomus; Lacordaire, 1863

= Brachyomus =

Genus of beetles

Brachyomus is a Neotropical genus of broad-nosed weevils in the subfamily Entiminae, tribe Eustylini.

== Taxonomy ==
Brachyomus was described for the first time by Jean-Baptiste Henri Lacordaire in 1863 (p. 130).

== Description ==
Members of the genus Brachyomus are easily confused with members of the genus Compsus. Members of Brachyomus lack elytral shoulders and usually bear tubercles (four or more; there are only two in Compsus when they have them) on the broadest part of the elytra. They are usually covered by brown to whitish scales, forming some patterning; they can also bear metallic green or blue scales; some species have waxy secretions at the base of the elytral tubercles. There are thick scales rather uniform;y distributed all over the surface of the body, sometimes more densely so on the elytral tubercles. There is a key to identify most species in Faust (1892).

== Distribution ==
The genus Brachyomus is distributed in Colombia, Ecuador, French Guiana, Peru, Trinidad, Venezuela and Saint Vincent

== List of species ==
Brachyomus contains 7 described species:

1. Brachyomus bicostatus Faust, 1892: 14: Venezuela.
2. Brachyomus histrio Faust, 1892: 14: Venezuela.
3. Brachyomus metallescens Pascoe, 1880: 427: Ecuador, Peru.
4. Brachyomus octotuberculatus (Fabricius), 1787: 112: French Guiana, Trinidad, Venezuela.
5. Brachyomus quadrinodosus (Boheman), 1842: 217 = Brachyomus sallei Faust, 1892: 15: Colombia, Venezuela.
6. Brachyomus quadrituberculatus (Boheman), 1842: 216: Colombia, Venezuela.
7. Brachyomus tuberculatus (Boheman), 1842: 218: Saint Vincent.
