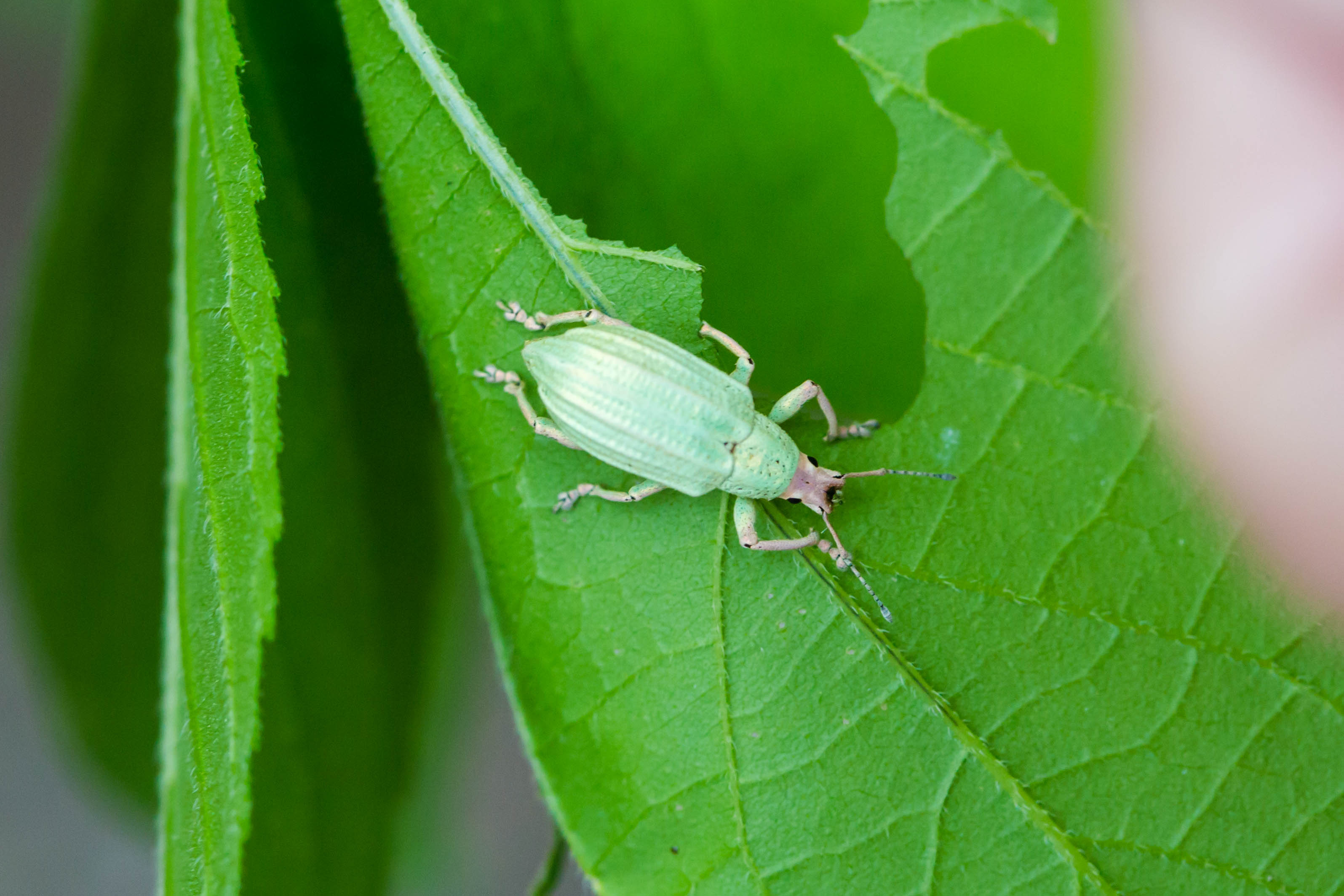

Scientific classification
- Kingdom: Animalia
- Phylum: Arthropoda
- Class: Insecta
- Order: Coleoptera
- Suborder: Polyphaga
- Infraorder: Cucujiformia
- Family: Curculionidae
- Genus: Compsus
- Species: C. auricephalus

Binomial name
- Compsus auricephalus (Say, 1824)

Synonyms
- Platyomus auriceps Schönherr, 1840

= Compsus auricephalus =

Species of beetle

Compsus auricephalus, the golden-headed weevil, is a species of broad-nosed weevil in the beetle family Curculionidae. It is native and fairly widespread across the southern U.S.A., extending through Central America in Guatemala and Mexico.

There are two color morphs of Compsus auricephalus: predominantly green with pink/coppery head and part of the legs, or completely white to pale brown.

The status, variation, distribution, and biological information about the species was revised in 2020.

== Taxonomy ==
The species was originally described by Thomas Say in 1824 under the name Curculio auricephalus on page 310. It belongs to the predominantly Neotropical genus Compsus in the tribe Eustylini, in the subfamily Entiminae. It is the northernmost distributed species of the genus and the only native representative of the genus in the U.S.A.

There is an additional species distributed in Costa Rica, Honduras, Nicaragua, and Panama (as far south as the Canal Zone) that partly matches the white morph of Compsus auricephalus. Its more elevated elytral intervals and features of the male genitalia confirm that it is a different species, although it is still unknown if this species has an existing name.

== Distribution ==
Compsus auricephalus is known from Guatemala, Mexico, and the U.S.A.

In the U.S.A. it has been recorded from Alabama, Arizona, Arkansas, Colorado, Florida*, Georgia*, Illinois, Kentucky, Louisiana, Mississippi, New Mexico, Ohio*, Oklahoma, Tennessee, Texas, and Utah. It has also been intercepted at ports of entry in Ontario, Canada.

== Life history ==
Compsus auricephalus has been collected in palmetto thickets and woods, on vegetation along roads, on prairies, and using a variety of methods (beating, blacklights, flight intercept traps, malaise traps, pitfall traps, sweeping, manual capture). The species has been found at elevations from sea level up to 1200 m, with most specimens collected below 100 m.

== Associated plants ==
Host specificity in broad-nosed weevils is difficult to assess, given that the presence of adults on a particular plant does not necessarily mean that feeding occurred. There are at least 46 plant species in 23 families that have been associated with Compsus auricephalus according to specimen label data.
