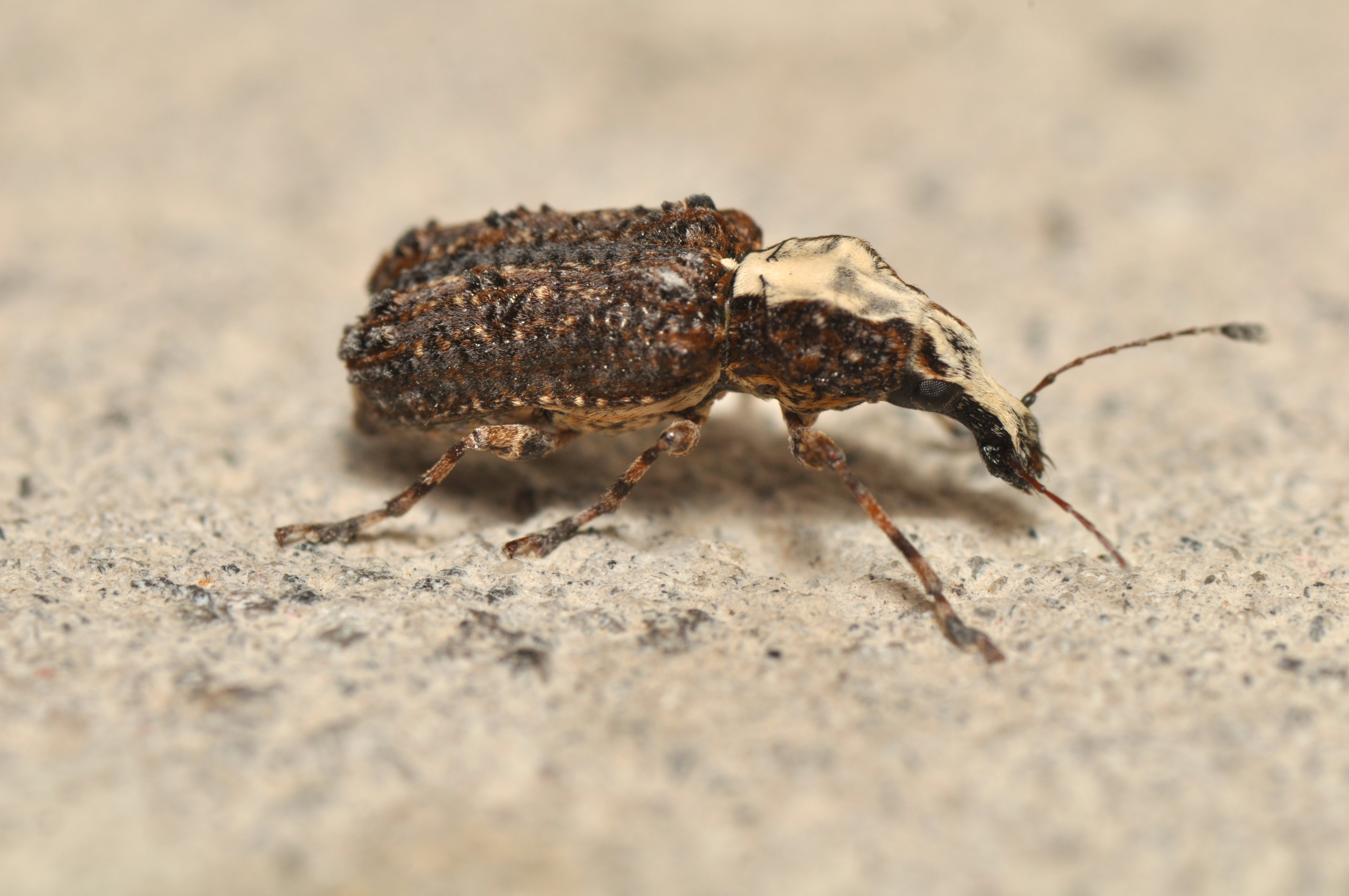
- Ischnocerus impressicollis

Scientific classification
- Domain: Eukaryota
- Kingdom: Animalia
- Phylum: Arthropoda
- Class: Insecta
- Order: Coleoptera
- Suborder: Polyphaga
- Infraorder: Cucujiformia
- Family: Anthribidae
- Subfamily: Anthribinae
- Genus: Ischnocerus; Schoenherr, 1839

= Ischnocerus =

Genus of beetles

Ischnocerus is a genus of fungus weevils in the beetle family Anthribidae. There are about 19 described species in Ischnocerus.

== Species ==
These 19 species belong to the genus Ischnocerus:

- Ischnocerus aeneus Jordan, 1895
- Ischnocerus angulata Martin, 1930
- Ischnocerus angulatus Martin, 1930
- Ischnocerus arizonicus Sleeper, 1954
- Ischnocerus championi Jordan
- Ischnocerus consors Jordan
- Ischnocerus fasciculatus Boheman, 1845
- Ischnocerus griseatus Jordan, 1906
- Ischnocerus impressicollis Jordan, 1895
- Ischnocerus infuscatus Fåhraeus, 1839
- Ischnocerus malleri Jordan, 1937
- Ischnocerus metallicus Jordan, 1906
- Ischnocerus mustelinus Boheman in Shoenherr, 1845
- Ischnocerus mustellinus Boheman, 1845
- Ischnocerus nigellus Schoenherr, 1839
- Ischnocerus spiculosus Chevrolat
- Ischnocerus tuberculatus Imhoff, 1842
- Ischnocerus tuberosus Fairmaire, 1897
- Ischnocerus vittiger Jordan, 1906
