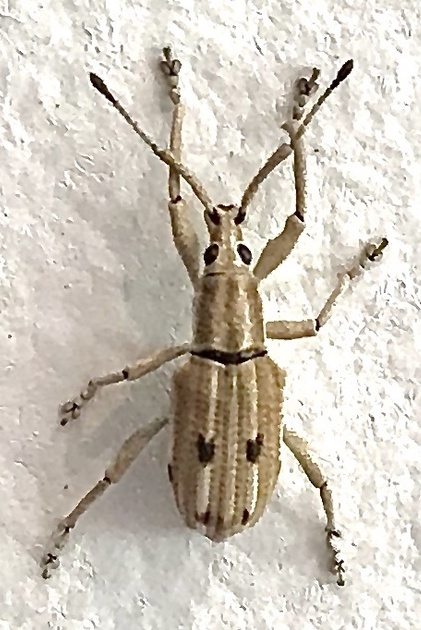
- Dorsal view of Eustylus

Scientific classification
- Kingdom: Animalia
- Phylum: Arthropoda
- Class: Insecta
- Order: Coleoptera
- Suborder: Polyphaga
- Infraorder: Cucujiformia
- Family: Curculionidae
- Subfamily: Entiminae
- Tribe: Eustylini
- Genus: Eustylus; Schönherr, 1843

= Eustylus =

Genus of beetles

Eustylus is a neotropical genus of broad-nosed weevils in the subfamily Entiminae, tribe Eustylini.

== Taxonomy ==
Eustylus was described for the first time by Carl Johan Schönherr in 1843 (p. 40). The Central American species were treated by Champion. Marshall 1916 offers a key to most species.

== Description ==
One of the most salient features of Eustylus is its broad antennal scape, densely and uniformly covered by scales (see Fig. 7F in Girón 2020). Some species bear a spine on the inner margin of the profemur, which is unusual for eustylines. Most species are uniformly covered by brown scales forming different patterns; metallic green species are also found.

== Distribution ==
The genus Eustylus ranges from Mexico to Paraguay, with some species represented in the Caribbean

== List of species ==
Eustylus contains 26 described species:

1. Eustylus aequus Marshall, 1916: 464: Brazil.
2. Eustylus bodkini Marshall, 1916: 456: Colombia, Guyana, Venezuela.
3. Eustylus chiriquensis Champion, 1911: 294: Panama.
4. Eustylus cinericius Champion, 1911: 296: Guatemala.
5. Eustylus ephippiatus Marshall, 1916: 458: Colombia.
6. Eustylus funicularis Kirsch, 1874: 390: Bolivia, Peru.
7. Eustylus grypsatus Boheman, 1843: 27: Mexico.
8. Eustylus hybridus Rosenschoeld, 1840: 200: Guadeloupe, Saint Lucia.
9. Eustylus inclusus Marshall, 1916: 461: Brazil.
10. Eustylus magdalenae Marshall, 1926: 536: Colombia.
11. Eustylus obliquefasciatus Marshall, 1916: 455: Venezuela.
12. Eustylus puber Olivier, 1807: 367: Colombia, French Guiana, Guyana, Trinidad, Venezuela.
13. Eustylus quadrigibbus Champion, 1911: 292: Mexico.
14. Eustylus ruptus Champion, 1911: 293: Costa Rica, Panama.
15. Eustylus scapularis Marshall, 1916: 464: Brazil.
16. Eustylus setipennis Champion, 1911: 292: Guatemala.
17. Eustylus sexguttatus Champion, 1911: 291: Panama.
18. Eustylus simplex Marshall, 1916: 460: Colombia.
19. Eustylus simulatus Marshall, 1916: 459: Colombia.
20. Eustylus sordidus Marshall, 1916: 460: Colombia.
21. Eustylus striatus Boheman, 1843: 42: Mexico.
22. Eustylus subapterus Champion, 1911: 295: Guatemala, Mexico.
23. Eustylus subfasciatus Voss, 1932: 40: Paraguay.
24. Eustylus subguttatus Marshall, 1916: 462: Brazil.
25. Eustylus subuittatus Marshall, 1916: 457: Venezuela.
26. Eustylus veraepacis Champion, 1911: 294: Guatemala.
