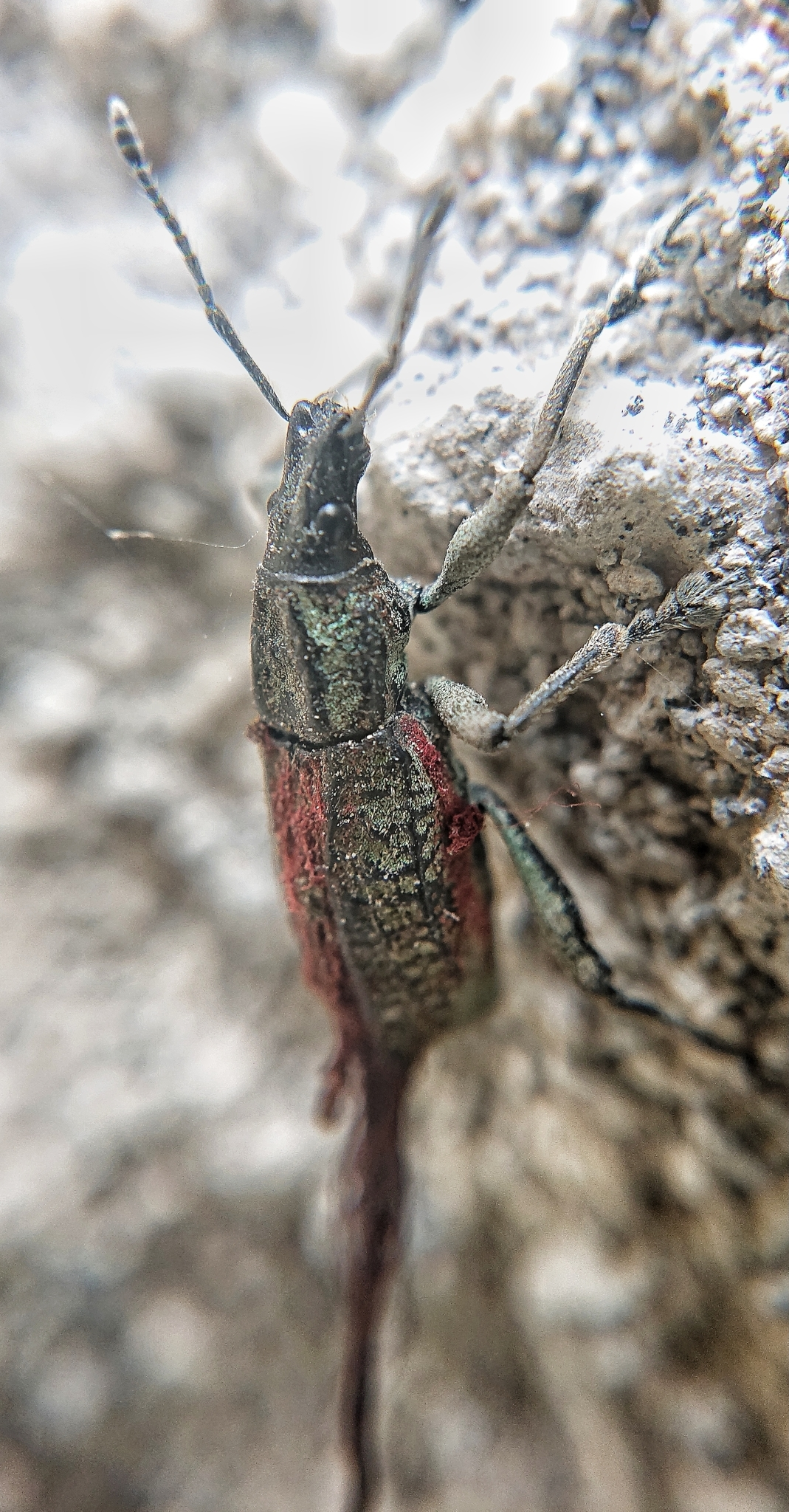
- Exorides wagneri

Scientific classification
- Kingdom: Animalia
- Phylum: Arthropoda
- Clade: Pancrustacea
- Class: Insecta
- Order: Coleoptera
- Suborder: Polyphaga
- Infraorder: Cucujiformia
- Superfamily: Curculionoidea
- Family: Curculionidae
- Tribe: Eustylini
- Genus: Exorides; Pascoe, 1881

= Exorides =

Genus of beetles

Exorides is a genus of broad-nosed weevils in the family Curculionidae, tribe Eustylini, distributed in northern South America.

== Taxonomy ==
Exorides was described for the first time by Francis P. Pascoe in 1881 (p. 43). A discussion about the genus along with a key to most species was published by Guy A. K. Marshall in 1922. It belongs to the so-called "Compsus genus complex".

== Description ==
Species of the genus Exorides are easily confused with members of the genus Compsus, as well as with members of the genus Xestogaster.

A "provisional" diagnosis for Exorides is offered by Marshall:

Owing, however, to the diversity of the species at present included in Compsus, it is not easy to give a really satisfactory definition of Pascoe's genus, but it is here provisionally regarded as including those forms that present the following combination of characters : — Wings non-functional; the elytra narrow at the shoulders, with the bases more or less truncate obliquely and not separately rounded so as to project over the base of the prothorax; the scrobes continued right up to the lower anterior margin of the eye; and the scape of the antennae comparatively slender, abruptly clavate, and clothed only with pubescence or narrow hair-like scales, never with broad overlapping scales.

— Guy A. K. Marshall, VI. On new genera and species of Neotropical Curculionidae., p. 202.

The scale coverage in Exorides is highly variable, from absent to dense, including iridescent or metallic colorations. Some species are able to produce waxy secretions and filaments, but this is not common across the genus.

== Distribution ==
Members of the genus Exorides can be found in Colombia, Ecuador, Peru, and Venezuela.

== Species list ==
The genus contains 29 described species:

1. Exorides abruptecostatus Marshall, 1922: 210: Ecuador.
2. Exorides bifurcatus Marshall, 1926: 537: Colombia.
3. Exorides caudatus Marshall, 1922: 217= Exorides rudeli Voss, 1953: 259: Colombia.
4. Exorides corrugatus Marshall, 1922: 218: Venezuela.
5. Exorides cylindricus Marshall, 1922: 213: Colombia.
6. Exorides equatorius Marshall, 1922: 219: Ecuador, Peru.
7. Exorides equicaudatus Marshall, 1922: 207: Ecuador.
8. Exorides espeletiae (Kirsch), 1889: 23: Colombia.
9. Exorides festivus Marshall, 1952: 325: Venezuela.
10. Exorides immadidus Kuschel, 1950: 71: Peru.
11. Exorides labyrinthicus (Kirsch), 1889: 22: Colombia.
12. Exorides lajoyei (Bovie), 1907: 68: Venezuela.
13. Exorides lindingi (Kirsch), 1889: 24: Colombia.
14. Exorides marshalli (Bovie), 1908: 44: Colombia.
15. Exorides masoni Marshall, 1922: 215: Venezuela.
16. Exorides mucronatus (Faust), 1892: 18= Exorides inflatus Marshall, 1922: 214: Colombia, Venezuela.
17. Exorides obesus Marshall, 1922: 209: Colombia.
18. Exorides octocostatus Hustache, 1938: 117: Peru.
19. Exorides otiosus Hustache, 1938: 116: Ecuador.
20. Exorides pedunculatus Marshall, 1922: 216: Ecuador.
21. Exorides praeteritus Marshall, 1922: 206: Ecuador.
22. Exorides pyriformis Marshall, 1922: 211: Colombia.
23. Exorides quadrivittatus (Kirsch), 1889: 23: Colombia.
24. Exorides rugosus (Taschenberg), 1870: 188: Colombia.
25. Exorides septemcostatus Marshall, 1922: 212: Colombia, Ecuador.
26. Exorides sulcicollis (Kirsch), 1889: 24: Ecuador.
27. Exorides wagneri (Harold), 1863: 176 = Exorides carinatus Pascoe, 1881: 43: Ecuador.
28. Exorides whymperi (Olliff), 1891: 63: Ecuador.
29. Exorides willei Kuschel, 1950: 72: Peru.
