= Ischnocerus angulatus =

Scientific classification
- Domain: Eukaryota
- Kingdom: Animalia
- Phylum: Arthropoda
- Class: Insecta
- Order: Coleoptera
- Suborder: Polyphaga
- Infraorder: Cucujiformia
- Family: Anthribidae
- Genus: Ischnocerus
- Species: I. angulatus

Binomial name
- Ischnocerus angulatus Martin, 1930

Species of beetle

Ischnocerus angulatus is a species of fungus weevil in the beetle family Anthribidae.
