= Polydacrys depressifrons =

Scientific classification
- Kingdom: Animalia
- Phylum: Arthropoda
- Class: Insecta
- Order: Coleoptera
- Suborder: Polyphaga
- Infraorder: Cucujiformia
- Family: Curculionidae
- Genus: Polydacrys
- Species: P. depressifrons

Binomial name
- Polydacrys depressifrons Boheman, 1840

Synonyms
- Pandeleteius nubilosus Boheman, 1840; Pandeletejus cavirostris Schaeffer, 1908

Species of beetle

Polydacrys depressifrons is a species of broad-nosed weevil in the beetle family Curculionidae. It is found in North America.
