= Achrastenus =

Scientific classification
- Kingdom: Animalia
- Phylum: Arthropoda
- Clade: Pancrustacea
- Class: Insecta
- Order: Coleoptera
- Suborder: Polyphaga
- Infraorder: Cucujiformia
- Superfamily: Curculionoidea
- Family: Curculionidae
- Tribe: Eustylini
- Genus: Achrastenus; Horn, 1876

Genus of beetles

Achrastenus is a genus of broad-nosed weevils in the beetle family Curculionidae. There is at least one described species in Achrastenus, A. griseus.
