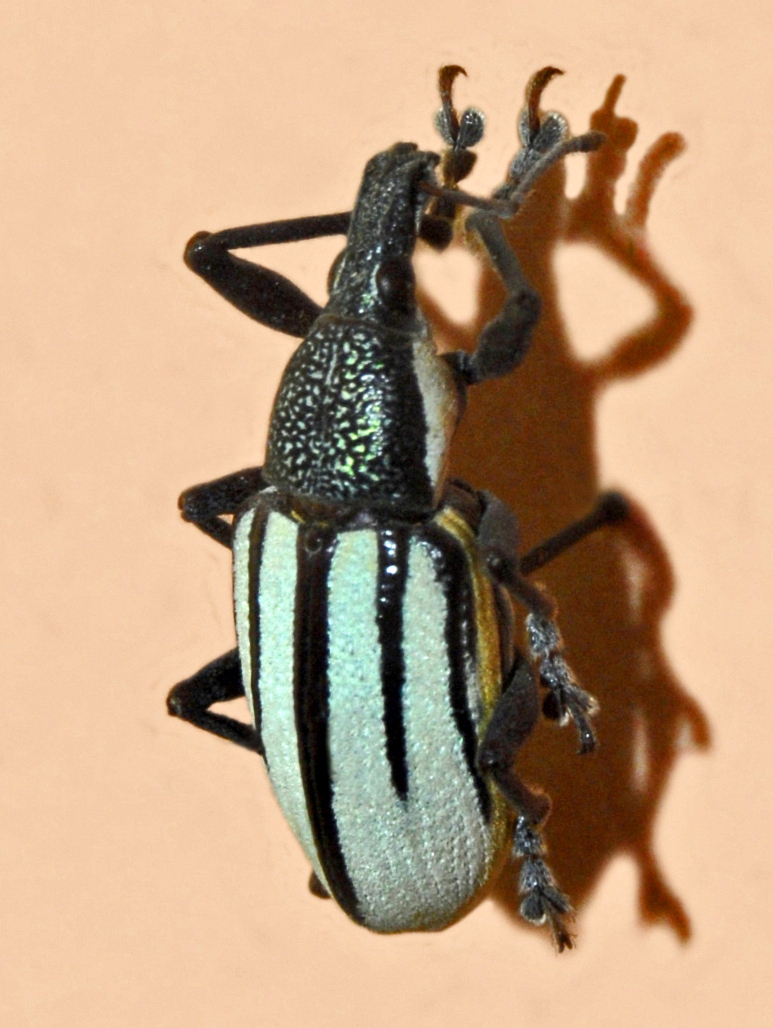
- Diaprepes abbreviatus

Scientific classification
- Domain: Eukaryota
- Kingdom: Animalia
- Phylum: Arthropoda
- Class: Insecta
- Order: Coleoptera
- Suborder: Polyphaga
- Infraorder: Cucujiformia
- Family: Curculionidae
- Subfamily: Entiminae
- Tribe: Eustylini
- Genus: Diaprepes; Schönherr, 1823

= Diaprepes =

Genus of beetles

Diaprepes Schönherr 1823: 1140 is a genus of broad-nosed weevil belonging to the family Curculionidae, subfamily Entiminae, tribe Eustylini.

It is part of the so-called Exophthalmus genus complex.

== Distribution ==
Distributed in the Caribbean, Central America and Florida: Trinidad, Venezuela; Honduras, Nicaragua; Antigua, Barbados, Cuba, Dominica, Guadeloupe, Haiti, Hispaniola, Martinique, Mona, Montserrat, Nevis, Puerto Rico, St. Barthelemy, St. Croix, St. Kitts, St. Lucia, St. Thomas, St. Vincent, Vieques; SE USA (Florida).

== Species ==
- Diaprepes abbreviatus (Linnaeus, 1758)
- Diaprepes balloui Marshall, 1916
- Diaprepes boxi Marshall, 1938
- Diaprepes comma Boheman, 1834
- Diaprepes doublierii Guérin, 1847
- Diaprepes excavatus Rosenschoeld, 1840
- Diaprepes famelicus (Olivier, 1790)
- Diaprepes glaucus (Olivier, 1807)
- Diaprepes marginatus (Fabricius, 1775)
- Diaprepes maugei (Boheman, 1840)
- Diaprepes reticulatus Chevrolat, 1880
- Diaprepes revestitus Chevrolat, 1880
- Diaprepes rohrii (Fabricius, 1775)
- Diaprepes rufescens Boheman, 1840
- Diaprepes sommeri (Rosenschoeld, 1840)
- Diaprepes variegatus Chevrolat, 1880
