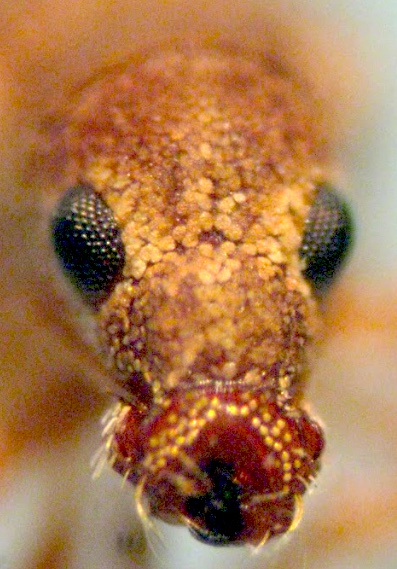
- Head of Anypotactus exilis

Scientific classification
- Kingdom: Animalia
- Phylum: Arthropoda
- Clade: Pancrustacea
- Class: Insecta
- Order: Coleoptera
- Suborder: Polyphaga
- Infraorder: Cucujiformia
- Superfamily: Curculionoidea
- Family: Curculionidae
- Subfamily: Entiminae
- Tribe: Anypotactini; Champion, 1911

Genera
- See text

= Anypotactini =

Tribe of beetles

The Anypotactini are a Neotropical weevil tribe in the subfamily Entiminae. It includes 81 described species.

== Distribution ==
The tribe ranges from south-western USA (Texas) to Argentina and Chile and some Caribbean islands. Most genera are distributed in Central America and northern South America, but the largest genus, Hyphantus Germar, 1824 (45 species), is distributed in southern Brazil, Argentina, Paraguay and Uruguay.

The Central American species were studied by Champion (1911).

== Identification ==
Most anypotactines are small (approx. 4–11 mm), covered by brown scales, with some members of the genus Prepodellus covered by metallic green or blue scales. The dorsal surface of the body usually bears thick and erect scale-like setae, rather uniformly distributed. Members of the genus Hyphantus tend to be larger and dark in coloration.

== Genera ==
- Anypotactus Schönherr, 1840: 299
- Bothinodontes Kirsch, 1868: 241
- Cylloproctus Faust, 1892: 22
- Helicorrhynchus Olliff, 1891: 61
- Hyphantus Germar, 1824: 334
- Hypsometopus Kirsch, 1868: 222
- Neoanypotactus Hustache, 1938: 266
- Nototactus Kuschel, 1952: 231
- Paonaupactus Voss, 1953: 127 (+)
- Phanasora Pascoe, 1881: 38
- Polydacrys Schönherr, 1834: 130
- Prepodellus Kirsch, 1868: 239
- Sitonites Heer, 1864: 90 (+)
