= Ischnocerus infuscatus =

Scientific classification
- Domain: Eukaryota
- Kingdom: Animalia
- Phylum: Arthropoda
- Class: Insecta
- Order: Coleoptera
- Suborder: Polyphaga
- Infraorder: Cucujiformia
- Family: Anthribidae
- Genus: Ischnocerus
- Species: I. infuscatus

Binomial name
- Ischnocerus infuscatus Fåhraeus, 1839

Species of beetle

Ischnocerus infuscatus is a species of fungus weevil in the beetle family Anthribidae.
