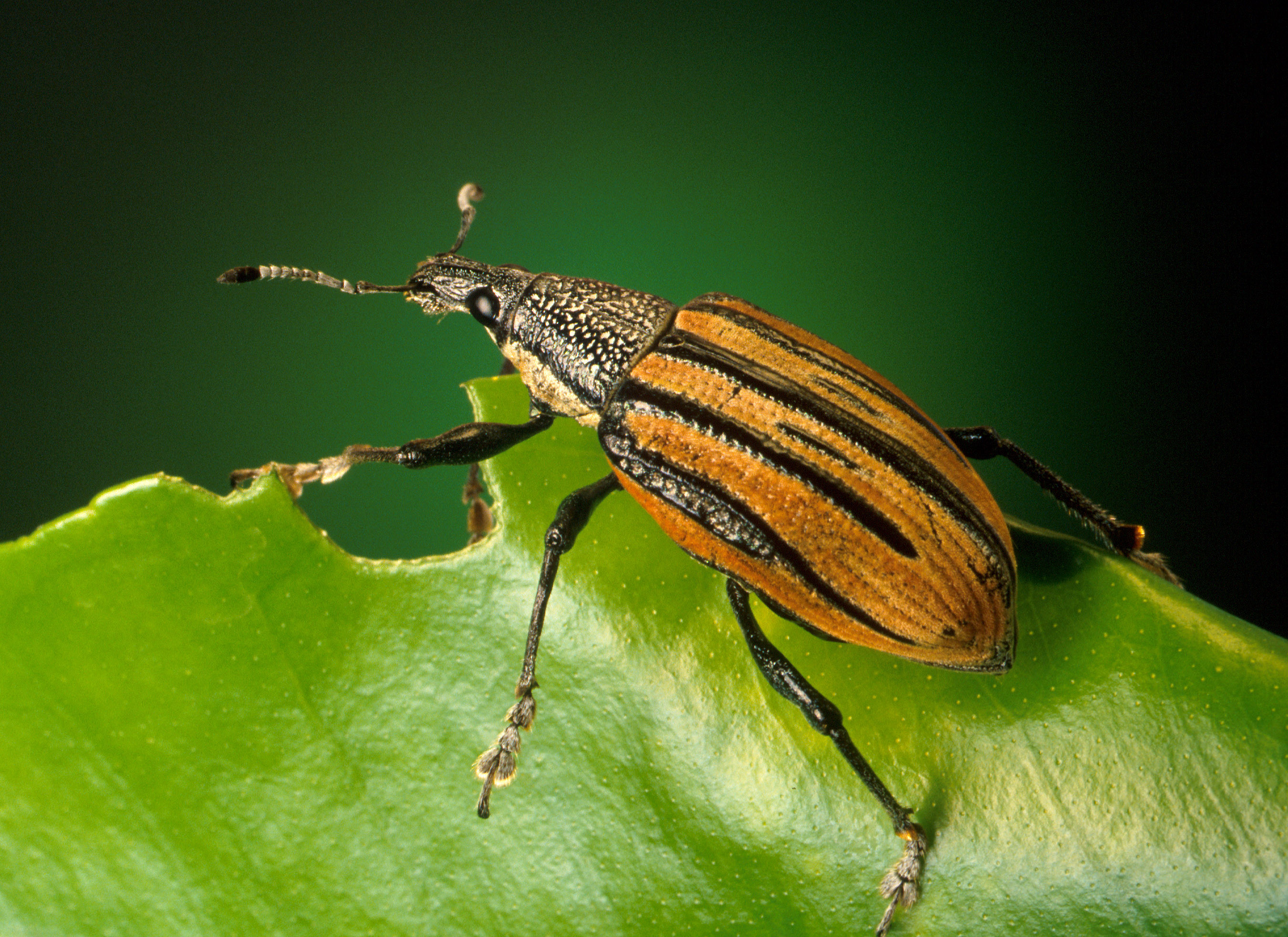

Scientific classification
- Kingdom: Animalia
- Phylum: Arthropoda
- Clade: Pancrustacea
- Class: Insecta
- Order: Coleoptera
- Suborder: Polyphaga
- Infraorder: Cucujiformia
- Superfamily: Curculionoidea
- Family: Curculionidae
- Genus: Diaprepes
- Species: D. abbreviatus

Binomial name
- Diaprepes abbreviatus (Linnaeus, 1758)

Synonyms
- Curculio abbreviatus Linnaeus, 1758

= Diaprepes abbreviatus =

Species of beetle

Diaprepes abbreviatus, also known as the diaprepes root weevil, citrus root weevil and sugarcane rootstock borer weevil, is a species of weevil that is native to the Caribbean, where in Spanish it is colloquially called chichí. It has become an invasive pest in several locations in the United States.

== Range ==
=== Native range ===
It is an agricultural pest in several Caribbean countries.

=== Introduced range ===
In 1964 this weevil was accidentally introduced in the US, state of Florida, where it is presently a major pest of citrus. It was first discovered in southern California in 2005, where it is a pest of citrus, avocado, and nursery stock. In Texas it was found in the Rio Grande Valley in 2000, resulting in a 2001 quarantine, and then in 2009 around Houston. Another sighting in 2019 confirms that it is still in the area. In June of 2022, a new sighting also occurred in Pearland.

== Hosts ==
Citrus, avocado, and nursery stock. It is also known to infest sugarcane, tuber-bearing crops such as potatoes, and ornamental plants.

== Life history ==
The adult citrus root weevil is somewhat variable in size but just over 1 cm (3/8 in) in length on average. Its elytra are glossy black with large stripes of tiny yellowish-orange scales, and its head and legs are black. It has adhesive pads on its legs which confer the ability to adhere to very smooth surfaces. The larva is a plump pale grub with a dark head, up to 2.5 cm (31/32 in) in length. A female weevil might lay 5,000 eggs, depositing them in clusters on leaves, then folding and gluing the leaves together. After a week the larvae emerge from the eggs, fall to the ground, and burrow down to the roots of the host plant. They feed on the roots for several months, which is very damaging to the plant. While the adult weevil does feed on the foliage of the plant, it is the larvae that do the most damage. They often eat the taproot of the plant, which can kill it by depriving it of water and nutrients or by making it vulnerable to infection by fungi, or water moulds such as Phytophthora. The weevil spreads mainly by "hitchhiking" when infested plants, soil, and containers are moved from site to site.

== Biocontrol ==
A variety of agents are being studied as possible biological pest controls for the weevil, including ants, parasitic wasps, at least one virus, Bacillus thuringiensis, and a fungal adulticide. The nematode Steinernema riobravis is released in irrigation water in infested fields in Florida to combat the pest.
