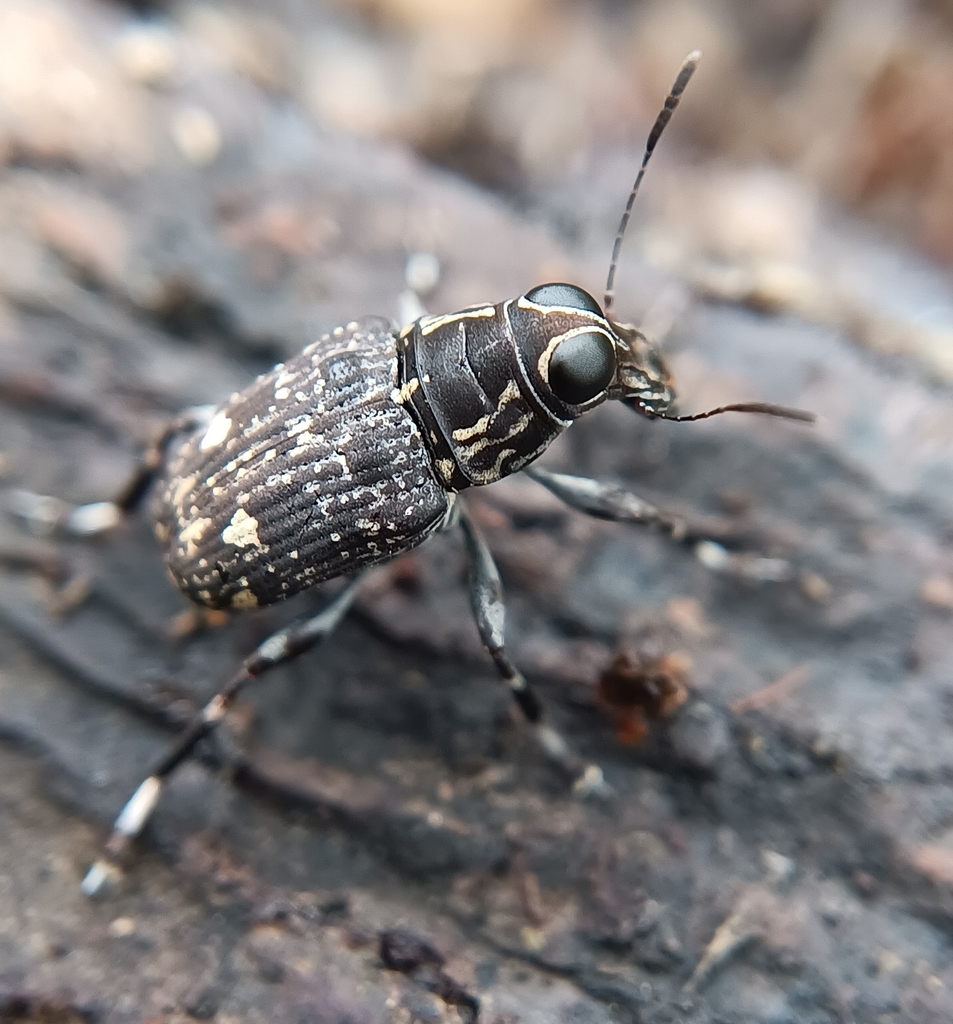

Scientific classification
- Kingdom: Animalia
- Phylum: Arthropoda
- Class: Insecta
- Order: Coleoptera
- Suborder: Polyphaga
- Infraorder: Cucujiformia
- Family: Anthribidae
- Genus: Acorynus
- Species: A. luzonicus

Binomial name
- Acorynus luzonicus Jordan, 1895

= Acorynus luzonicus =

Species of weevil

Acorynus luzonicus is a species of fungus weevil. It is native to the Philippines, Taiwan, and Indonesia (Sulawesi).

== Description ==
This species has large black eyes with white rings around them, a black abdomen and a black joiner with four "zebra print" stripes. The abdomen has irregular two white dots and white speckling.

== Subspecies ==
Subspecies are found in Taiwan and Sulawesi.
