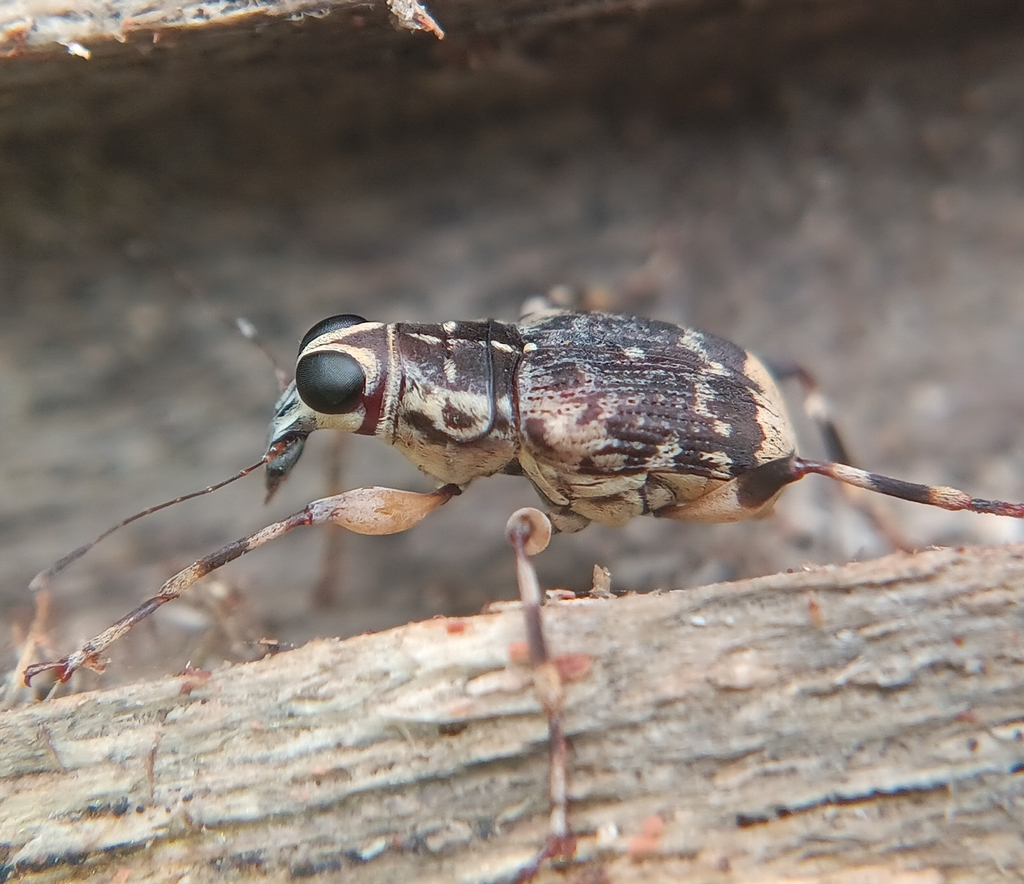

Scientific classification
- Kingdom: Animalia
- Phylum: Arthropoda
- Class: Insecta
- Order: Coleoptera
- Suborder: Polyphaga
- Infraorder: Cucujiformia
- Family: Anthribidae
- Genus: Acorynus
- Species: A. analis

Binomial name
- Acorynus analis Jordan, 1895

= Acorynus analis =

Species of beetle

Acorynus analis is a species of fungus weevil.
