= Gabriel Marklin =

Swedish naturalist and bibliographer

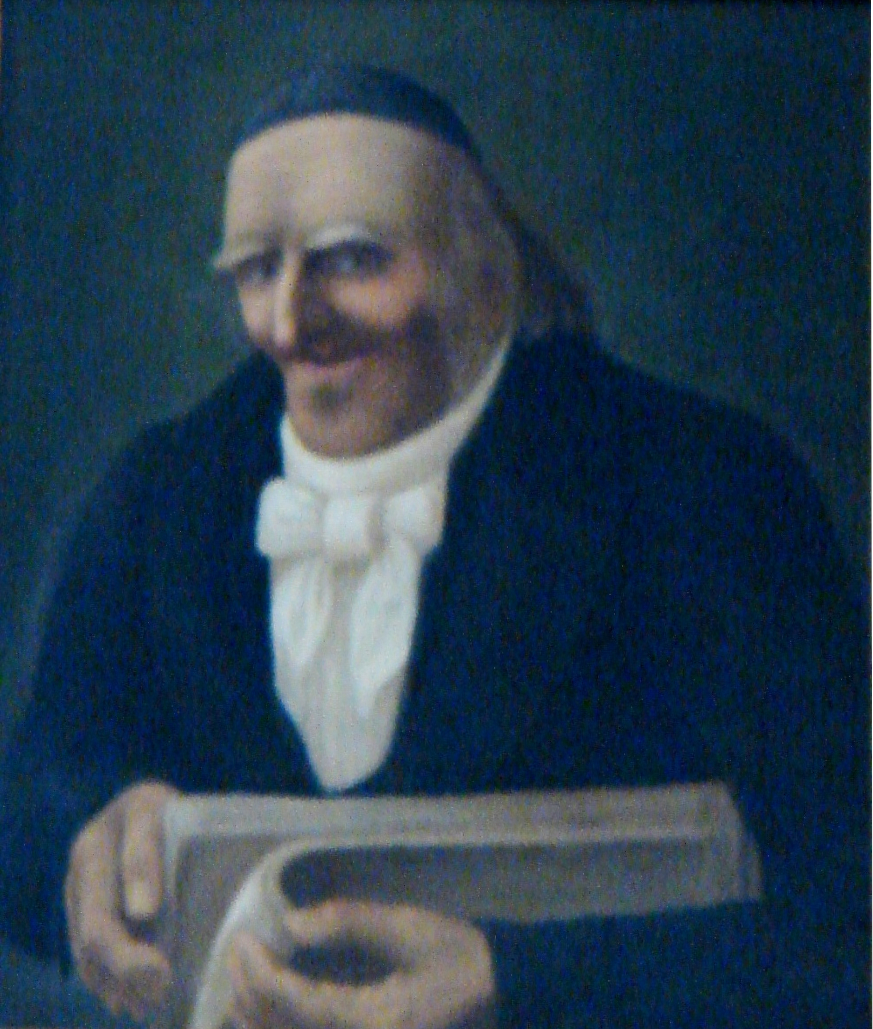
A portrait made by the tailor E. Österlund

Gabriel Marklin (July 1, 1777 – August 29, 1857) was a Swedish naturalist and collector. Born in a poor farming family he entered Uppsala University and was made a member of the Swedish Academy of Sciences to which he bequeathed his large natural history specimen. He also made a catalogue of academic dissertations (disputations) and collected academic dissertations which he sold to make a living.

== Life and work ==
Marklin was born in the large farming family of Hans Jonsson and Sara Eriksdotter in Ersmarks village in Västerbotten, Skellefteå parish. He worked as a farmhand and went to school in Piteå and Härnösands working on the side to support himself. In 1803 he entered Uppsala University. He trained in entomology under Gyllenhall at Höberg, earning money as a tutor. In 1818 he translated Illiger's work on systematic terminology for plants and animals. In 1824 he became an amanuens under Carl Thunberg at the university museum. He became a lecturer at the Swedish Society of Sciences in 1829. He led a spartan life and was supported by scholarships from academies and others. Through his life he collected natural history specimens, mainly insects and fossils, from across the region. He also collected 20,000 academic dissertations which he sold in 1836 to Count Paul Riant and which was later acquired by Yale University. He was given an honorary doctorate by Uppsala University in 1857. He died during a cholera outbreak in Uppsala where he is buried.
