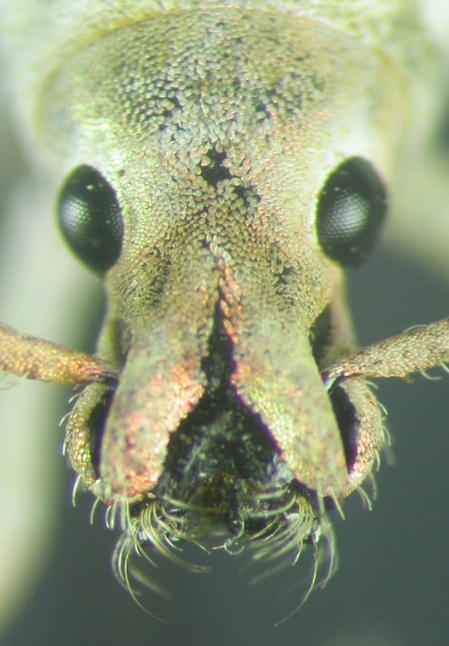
- Compsus sp.

Scientific classification
- Kingdom: Animalia
- Phylum: Arthropoda
- Clade: Pancrustacea
- Class: Insecta
- Order: Coleoptera
- Suborder: Polyphaga
- Infraorder: Cucujiformia
- Superfamily: Curculionoidea
- Family: Curculionidae
- Subfamily: Entiminae
- Tribe: Eustylini
- Genus: Compsus; Schönherr, 1823

Type species
- Compsus gyllenhali Schönherr, 1823

Species
- See text

= Compsus =

Genus of beetles

Compsus is a genus of broad-nosed weevils in the family Curculionidae, distributed across the Americas, primarily in northern South America.

== Taxonomy ==
The genus Compsus was first named by Carl Johan Schönherr in 1823: col. 1140. It belongs to the subfamily Entiminae, tribe Eustylini and to the so-called "Compsus genus complex".

A key to identify species was provided by Hustache in 1938 (in French), which was translated to English and adjusted by O'Brien and Peña.

== Description ==
Broad-nosed weevils of moderate size (approx. 7–12 mm), most of them uniformly covered by scales of variable coloration ranging from white to metallic green, pink, and blue.

Many morphological features of Compsus overlap with those of related eustyline genera including Exorides, Eustylus, and Oxyderces, composing the so-called "Compsus genus complex".

== Distribution ==
Argentina, Bolivia, Brazil, Colombia, Ecuador, French Guiana, Guyana, Peru, Suriname, Venezuela; Costa Rica, Guatemala, Mexico, Nicaragua, Panama; Guadeloupe, Jamaica, NC, SE, SW USA.

== Interaction with other species ==
Two species in the genus (Compsus obliquatus and Compsus viridivittatus) are considered pests of Citrus in Colombia.

Compsus auricephalus, known as the golden-headed weevil is the species with northernmost distribution and has association with 46 plant species in 23 families.

== Species ==
The genus contains 101 described species.

- Compsus acrolithus
- Compsus adamantinus
- Compsus adonis
- Compsus aeruginosus
- Compsus affinis
- Compsus albarius
- Compsus albosetosus
- Compsus albus
- Compsus alternans
- Compsus alternevittatus
- Compsus apiarius
- Compsus argentinicus
- Compsus argyreus
- Compsus armatissimus
- Compsus ater
- Compsus atrosignatus
- Compsus attenuatus
- Compsus auricephalus
- Compsus auriceps
- Compsus aurisquamosus
- Compsus azureipes
- Compsus bellus
- Compsus benoisti
- Compsus bicarinatus
- Compsus bicoloratus
- Compsus biimpressus
- Compsus bimaculatus
- Compsus bisignatus
- Compsus bituberculatus
- Compsus bituberosus
- Compsus bourcieri
- Compsus caeruleipes
- Compsus candidus
- Compsus canescens
- Compsus canus
- Compsus caveatus
- Compsus chlorostictus
- Compsus cicatricosus
- Compsus cinerascens
- Compsus clarus
- Compsus coelestinus
- Compsus cometes
- Compsus confluens
- Compsus conspicillatus
- Compsus coruscus
- Compsus costaricensis
- Compsus cyanipes
- Compsus cyanitarsis
- Compsus cyphoides
- Compsus dalmani
- Compsus dejeani
- Compsus delicatulus
- Compsus deliciosus
- Compsus deplanatus
- Compsus dives
- Compsus divisus
- Compsus dorsalis
- Compsus dorsofuscus
- Compsus dubius
- Compsus elegans
- Compsus ermineus
- Compsus espletiae
- Compsus eustylodes
- Compsus exanguis
- Compsus fossicollis
- Compsus fractilineatus
- Compsus fulgidipes
- Compsus furcatus
- Compsus gemmeus
- Compsus gentilis
- Compsus glaucus
- Compsus gyllenhali
- Compsus hybridus
- Compsus interruptus
- Compsus iris
- Compsus isabellinus
- Compsus labyrinthicus
- Compsus lacteus
- Compsus lajoyei
- Compsus latifrons
- Compsus lebasi
- Compsus lepidus
- Compsus lindigi
- Compsus lineatus
- Compsus maricao
- Compsus marshalli
- Compsus molitor
- Compsus monachus
- Compsus nigropunctatus
- Compsus nigroundulatus
- Compsus niveus
- Compsus obliquatus
- Compsus obliquecostatus
- Compsus ochroleucus
- Compsus octodecimsignatus
- Compsus opalinus
- Compsus opulentus
- Compsus ostracion
- Compsus otti
- Compsus parviscutum
- Compsus parvus
- Compsus pertinax
- Compsus peruvianus
- Compsus placidus
- Compsus popayanus
- Compsus pugionatus
- Compsus pustulosus
- Compsus quadrilineatus
- Compsus quadrisignatus
- Compsus quadrivittatus
- Compsus religiosus
- Compsus roseomicans
- Compsus rufipes
- Compsus rugosus
- Compsus saucius
- Compsus scrutator
- Compsus sejunctus
- Compsus serietuberculatus
- Compsus signatus
- Compsus simoni
- Compsus sordidus
- Compsus spectabilis
- Compsus subcostatus
- Compsus sulcicollis
- Compsus sylvaticus
- Compsus tuberculatus
- Compsus variegatus
- Compsus vespertinus
- Compsus vestalis
- Compsus vilis
- Compsus violaceus
- Compsus virginalis
- Compsus virgineus
- Compsus viridilimbata
- Compsus viridimaculatus
- Compsus viridipunctatus
- Compsus viridis
- Compsus viridissimus
- Compsus viridivittatus
- Compsus viridulus
- Compsus wagneri
- Compsus westermanni
- Compsus whymperi
- Compsus zebra
