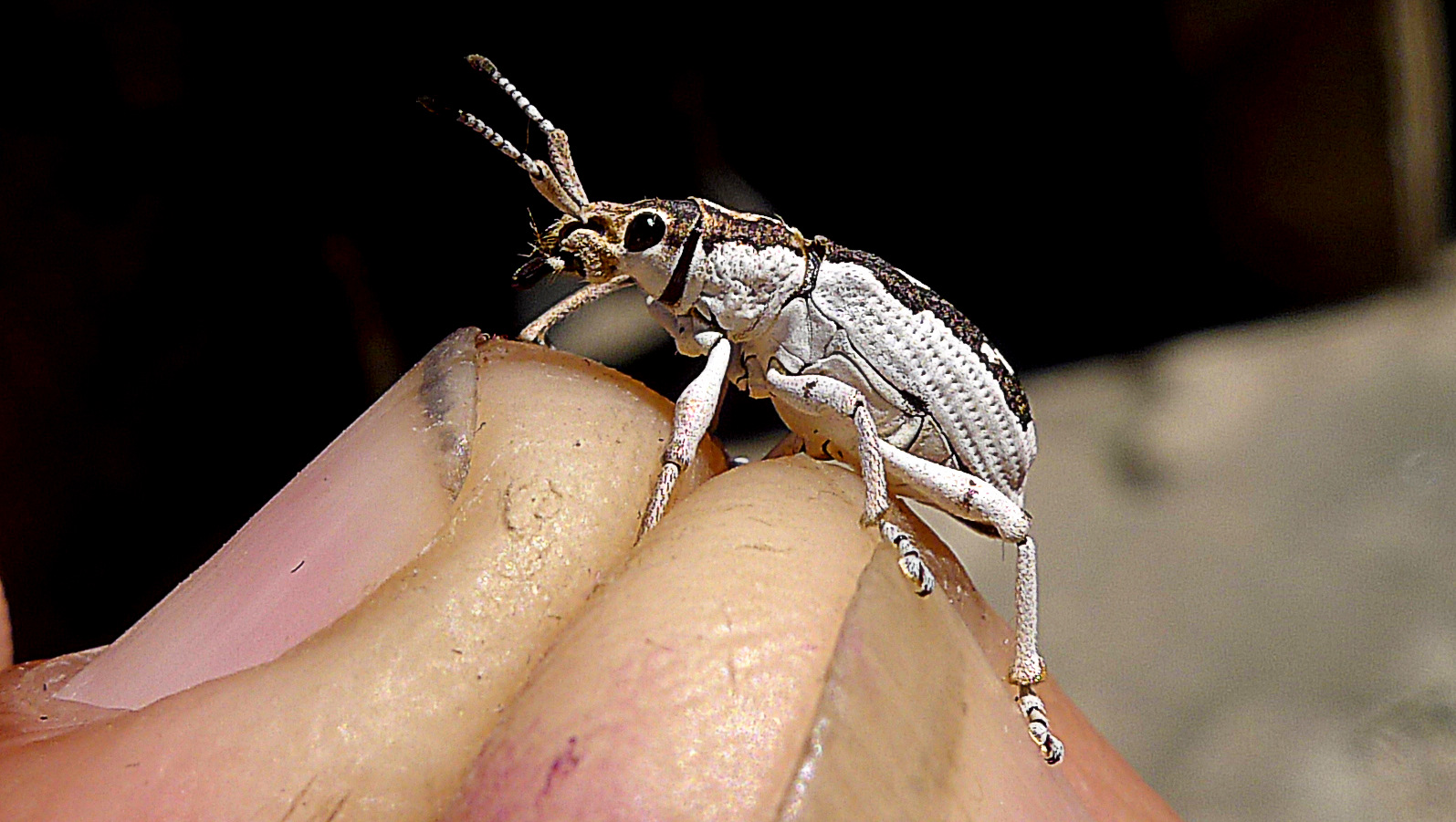
- Adult of unidentified Platyomus species, Atlantic Forest in Esplanada municipality, Bahia, Brazil

Scientific classification
- Kingdom: Animalia
- Phylum: Arthropoda
- Clade: Pancrustacea
- Class: Insecta
- Order: Coleoptera
- Suborder: Polyphaga
- Infraorder: Cucujiformia
- Superfamily: Curculionoidea
- Family: Curculionidae
- Tribe: Naupactini
- Genus: Platyomus; Sahlberg, 1823

Synonyms
- Plathyomus (lapsus)

= Platyomus =

Genus of beetles

Platyomus is a genus of broad-nosed weevils (subfamily Entiminae) in the family of beetles known as Curculionidae. Among its subfamily, this genus belongs to tribe Naupactini. There are more than 40 described species in Platyomus.

Some members of this genus are remarkably similar to certain species of the broad-nosed weevil genera Cydianerus and Rhigus, which belong to the Entiminae tribe Entimini.

== Species ==
These 46 species belong to the genus Platyomus:

- Platyomus agonista Germar, 1824^{c g}
- Platyomus angustifrons Voss, 1934^{c g}
- Platyomus atrosignatus Lucas, 1857^{c g}
- Platyomus auromaculatus (Voss, 1932)^{c g}
- Platyomus besckei Germar, 1824^{c g}
- Platyomus bruchi Hustache, 1926^{c g}
- Platyomus cauirostris Boheman, 1840^{c g}
- Platyomus chrysopus Champion, 1911^{c g}
- Platyomus crassicornis Lucas, 1857^{c g}
- Platyomus dianae Boheman, 1840^{c g}
- Platyomus duponti Boheman, 1833^{c g}
- Platyomus effusus Pascoe, 1880^{c g}
- Platyomus elegantulus Hustache, 1923^{c g}
- Platyomus eustaloides Champion, 1911^{c g}
- Platyomus eximius (Voss, 1932)^{c g}
- Platyomus fasciatus Boheman, 1840^{c g}
- Platyomus flexicaulis (Schaffer, 1905)^{c g b} – ebony broad-nosed weevil
- Platyomus geminus Champion, 1911^{c g}
- Platyomus gratiosus Champion, 1911^{c g}
- Platyomus gyllenhali Boheman, 1840^{c g}
- Platyomus humilis Erichson, 1847^{c g}
- Platyomus hystricosus Germar, 1824^{c g}
- Platyomus latacungae Kirsch, 1889^{c g}
- Platyomus macroscapus Champion, 1911^{c g}
- Platyomus marmomtus Marshall, 1922^{c g}
- Platyomus mollis Faust, 1890^{c g}
- Platyomus nigroguttatus Champion, 1911^{c g}
- Platyomus nodipennis Sahlberg, 1823^{c g} (= P.cultricollis)
- Platyomus ochraceus Hustache, 1938^{c g}
- Platyomus perlepidus Boheman, 1833^{c g} (= P.leucozonus)
- Platyomus piscatorius Germar, 1824^{c g}
- Platyomus planicollis Hustache, 1926^{c g}
- Platyomus prasinus Boheman, 1833^{c g}
- Platyomus sellatus Marshall, 1922^{c g}
- Platyomus septempunctatus Boheman, 1833^{c g}
- Platyomus signatus Rosenschoeld, 1840^{c g}
- Platyomus silbermanni Rosenschoeld, 1840^{c g}
- Platyomus squaminasus Champion, 1925^{c g}
- Platyomus transversesignatus Boheman, 1840^{c g}
- Platyomus tripunctatus Kirsch, 1874^{c g}
- Platyomus undulatus Boheman, 1833^{c g}
- Platyomus vermiculatus Hustache, 1938^{c g}
- Platyomus viridis Voss, 1934^{c g}
- Platyomus wahlenbergi Boheman, 1840^{c g}
- Platyomus wellsi Rheinheimer, 2007^{c g}
- Platyomus zebra Champion, 1911^{c g}

Data sources: c = Catalogue of Life, g = GBIF, b = Bugguide.net
