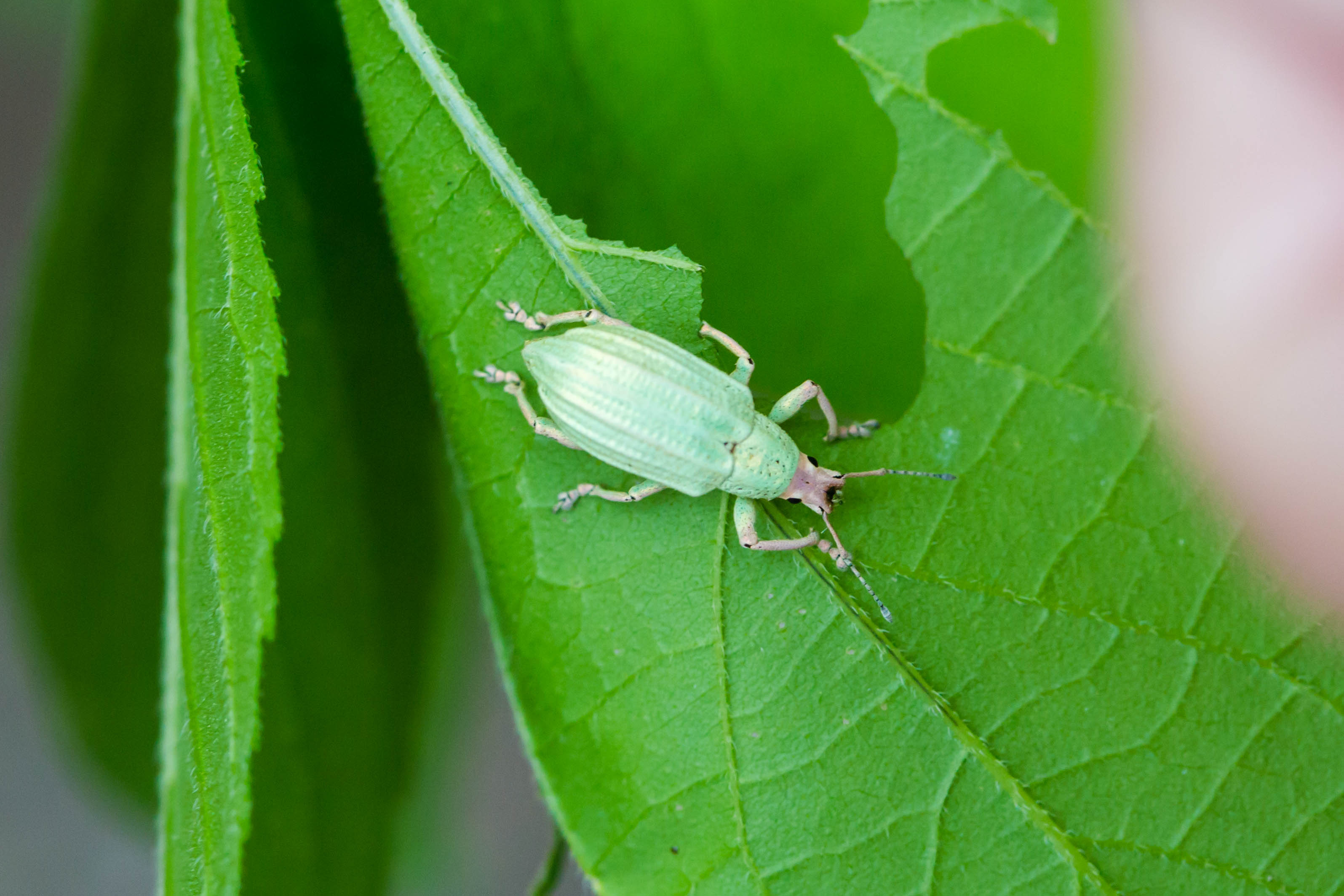
- Compsus auricephalus

Scientific classification
- Kingdom: Animalia
- Phylum: Arthropoda
- Clade: Pancrustacea
- Class: Insecta
- Order: Coleoptera
- Suborder: Polyphaga
- Infraorder: Cucujiformia
- Superfamily: Curculionoidea
- Family: Curculionidae
- Subfamily: Entiminae
- Tribe: Eustylini; Lacordaire, 1863

Genera
- See text

= Eustylini =

Tribe of beetles

Eustylini is a primarily Neotropical weevil tribe in the subfamily Entiminae.

== Taxonomy ==
The tribe Eustylini was named for the first time by Jean-Baptiste Henri Lacordaire in 1863, although, when first named, the tribe (Groupe Eustylides, p. 205) only contained three genera: Aptolemus (currently in Naupactini), Brachystylus, and Eustylus.

In 1986 the Eustylini contained most of its current genera, mostly due to revised taxonomic placements made by Guillermo Kuschel. The latest additions were made by Franz in 2012 by transferring former members of other tribes including Geonemini, Phyllobiini, and Tanymecini.

The type species of some genera (Compsus, Diaprepes, Eustylus, Exorides, and Exophthalmus) were redescribed by Franz. Most species of Eustylini are only known from their original descriptions.

== Description ==
A diagnosis for the tribe was offered by Girón 2020:

Medium to large weevils (approx. 10–25 mm); scale coverage highly variable in presence, density and coloration; iridescent scales, erect setae or waxy secretions are frequently present; surface smooth and even or strongly sculptured and irregular; head (including rostrum) subrectangular, nearly as long or longer than wide; eyes small to mid-sized, slightly dorsally positioned; frons usually as wide as or narrower than interantennal distance, often bearing median fovea; rostrum nearly parallel-sided or broadened apically; dorsal surface of rostrum with variable elevations or depressions, including longitudinal carinae or oblique fossae; antennal scrobe generally fully visible in dorsal view; nasal plate usually well developed, either depressed, flat or elevated regarding surface of rostrum; anterior margin of prothorax in lateral view straight, seldom slightly sinuate, never forming conspicuous postocular lobe; postocular setae may be present, if so, forming a fringe instead of a tuft; elytral shoulders usually well-developed, absent in Brachyomus, reduced in some Compsus and Exorides; tubercles and apical projections may be present on elytra; femora usually not toothed (except in some Eustylus).

— J.C. Girón, Status of knowledge of the broad-nosed weevils of Colombia (Coleoptera, Curculionidae, Entiminae).

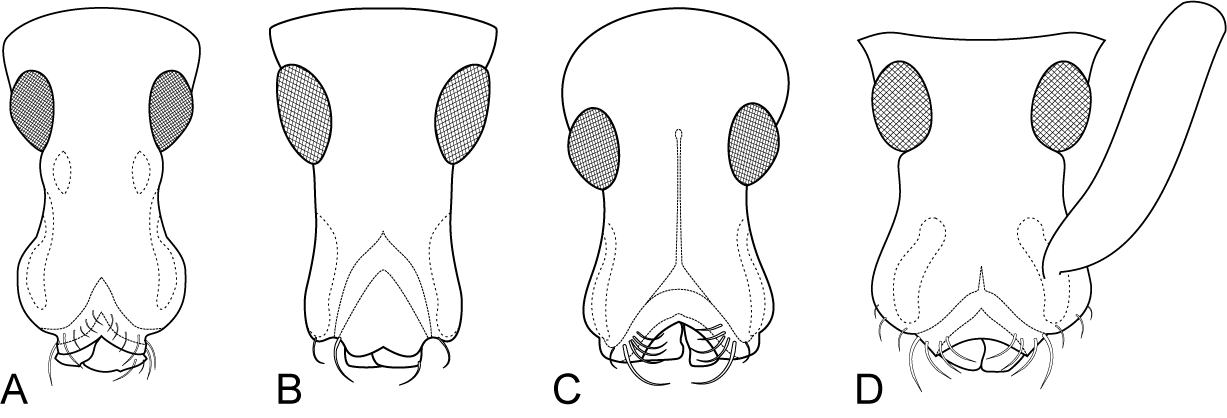
Heads in dorsal view: A Exophthalmus B Synthlibonotus C Exorides D Eustylus with characteristic broad antennal scape.

== Distribution ==
Eustylini ranges from south-western USA to Argentina, with its highest diversity in the Caribbean, Central America and northern South America.

== Genera ==
The tribe Eustylini currently includes 25 genera and 339 sdescribed species:

- Achrastenus Horn, 1876
- Anidius Kuschel, 1955
- Brachyomus Lacordaire, 1863
- Brachystylus Schönherr, 1845
- Chauliopleurus Champion, 1911
- Compsoricus Franz, 2012
- Coconotus Anderson & Lanteri, 2002
- Compsus Schönherr, 1823
- Diaprepes Schönherr, 1823
- Eustylus Schönherr, 1842
- Exophthalmus Schönherr, 1823
- Exorides Pascoe, 1881
- Galapagonotus Anderson & Lanteri, 2002
- Oxyderces Schönherr, 1823
- Pachnaeus Schönherr, 1826
- Parthenides Kuschel, 1986
- Phaops Sahlberg, 1823
- Phaopsis Kuschel, 1955
- Pseudeustylus Champion, 1911
- Rhinospathe Chevrolat, 1878
- Simophorus Faust, 1892
- Synthlibonotus Schönherr, 1847
- Tetrabothynus Labram & Imhoff, [1852]
- Tropirhinus Schönherr, 1823
- Xestogaster Marshall, 1922
