= Schoenherr =

Schönherr, Schoenherr may refer to:

== Schönherr ==
- Albrecht Schönherr (1911–2009), Protestant theologian and parish priest
- Annemarie Schönherr (1932–2013), German theologian
- Carl Johan Schönherr, ( zoological author abbreviation - Schoenherr) (1772–1848) Swedish naturalist and entomologist
- Christoph Schönherr (born 1952), German composer and lecturer
- Daniel Schönherr (?–1609), Saxon jurist and Mayor of Leipzig (1597–1600)
- David Schönherr (1822–1897), historian and publicist
- Dietmar Schönherr (1926–2014), Austrian actor, presenter and writer
- Eva Schönherr (born 1953), actress, film maker, author, and Ururenkelin von Louis Ferdinand Schönherr
- Hugo Schönherr, German architect
- Ivonne Schönherr (born 1981), actress
- Karl Schönherr (1867–1943), Austrian doctor, and writer of Austrian Heimat themes
- Louis (Ferdinand) Schönherr (1817–1911), inventor and businessman
- Max Schönherr (1903–1984), Austrian composer, conductor, and writer on music
- Oscar Emil Schönherr (1903–1968), teacher, musician and composer

== Schoenherr ==
- John Schoenherr (1935–2010), American illustrator
- Walter Joseph Schoenherr (1920–2007), American Catholic bishop

== See also ==
- Schoenherr Attorneys at Law
- Hasora schoenherr
