= Carl Johan Schönherr =

Swedish entomologist

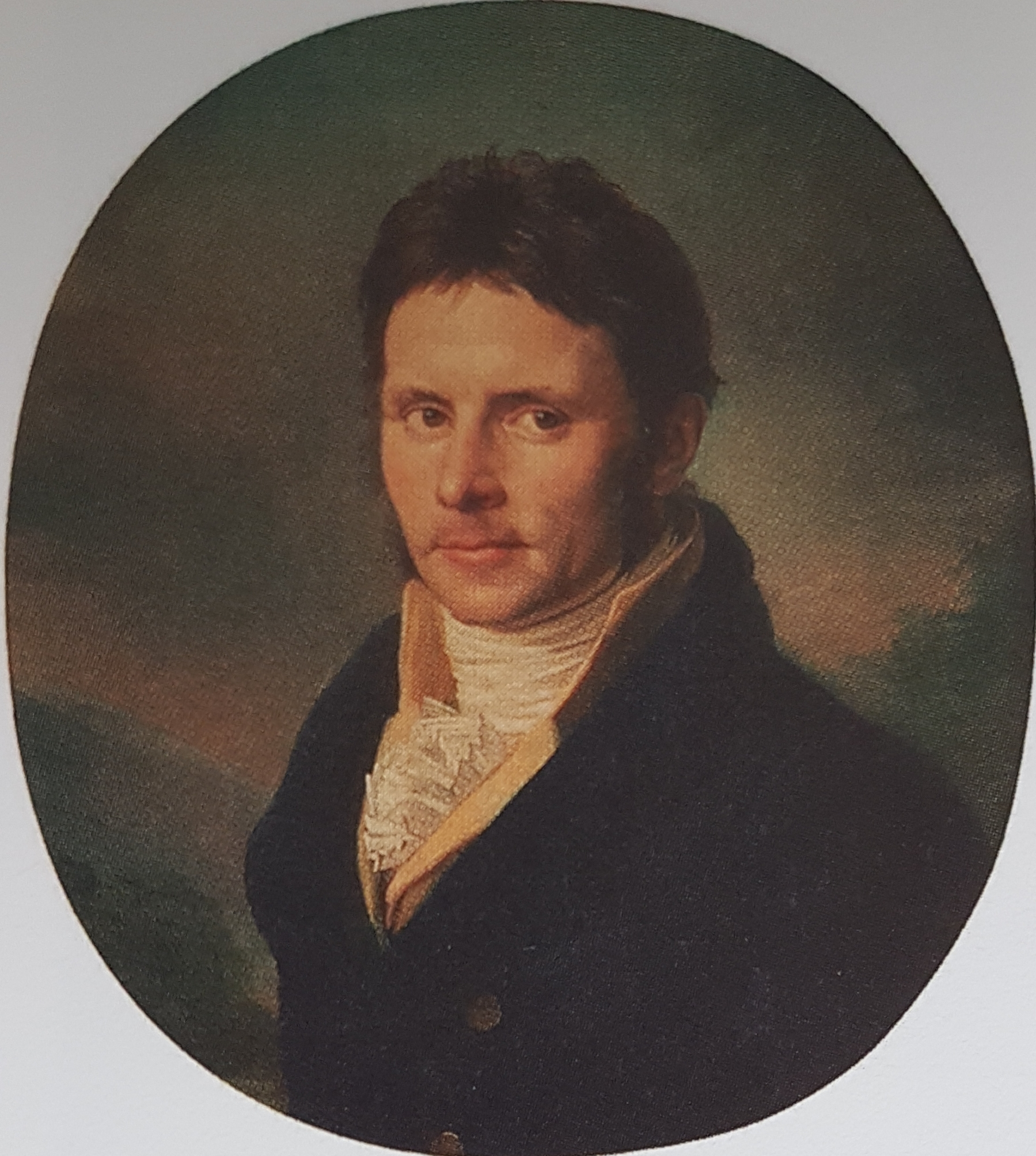
Portrait by Per Krafft the Younger

Carl Johan Schönherr (10 June 1772 – 28 March 1848) was a Swedish entomologist who revised the taxonomy of beetles, including weevils by examining all the descriptions of beetles since the time of Linnaeus. He began with an examination of the Charles de Geer collection which had been handed to the Swedish Academy of Sciences in 1778. He introduced the system of using a red label to mark historical specimens that had served as the basis of De Geer's descriptions. This continues to be a standard practice in entomological collections today for holotypes.

== Life and work ==
Born in Stockholm, Schönherr was son of a German immigrant who had established himself as a silk manufacturer. At the age of nineteen, he took over the business together with his mother and developed it into a considerable size, with about 200 workers. Schönherr had taken an interest in entomology, a contemporary trend inspired by Emanuel Swedenborg, since the age of twelve and was later further stimulated through his friendship with Gustaf Johan Billberg, his brother-in-law from his second marriage. He obtained insect specimens through ship captains and ship physicians who went around the world. He became aware of the fact that many species had been described and given a new name particularly by Charles de Geer and Carl Per Thunberg who did it even when knowing that the species had already been named. He was unable to study because of the demands of work and care of his mother but he was able to study on his own, acquiring skills in French, German, Greek and Latin. In 1805, he entered partnership with Erik Lundgren, and in 1811, following poor health, he sold the business to him, while retiring to his manor Sparresäter in Lerdala outside Skara in Västergötland, where he lived close to Leonard Gyllenhaal. Along with Gyllenhall he established a secret Swedenborgian society "Pro fide et caritate" and began to farm. He lived with his wife, seven daughters and a son. He worked at his home until his death in 1848.

In his Synonymia Insectorum he examined the names of beetles that had been described since Linnaeus' time. He compiled four volumes between 1808 and 1817. He collaborated intensely with numerous entomologists around the world including Friedrich August von Gebler, Gotthelf Fischer von Waldheim, Gabriel Marklin, Carl Henrik Boheman, Conrad Quensel, Latreille, and Leonard Gyllenhaal. Schönherr worked on weevils along with Auguste Chevrolat and worked on his seventeen volume Genera et species curculionidum, cum synonymia hujus familiae, specie novae aut hactenus minus cognitae, descriptionibus a dom. Leonardo Gyllenhal, C. H. Boheman; et entomologis aliis illustratae. Paris, Roret. (1833-1845) in which many new species were described. After his death, his family donated his collections which Boheman estimated as containing 52,437 specimens with nearly 12,000 specimens of weevils representing 4,200 species. His library was also bequeathed to the Academy of Sciences. The family also acquired Chevrolat's collection which was transferred to the academy. This was the nucleus for the Swedish Natural History Museum.

Schönherr was elected a member of the Royal Swedish Academy of Sciences in 1809. Several species have been named in his honour including Eupholus schoenherrii and Mononychus schoenherrii.
