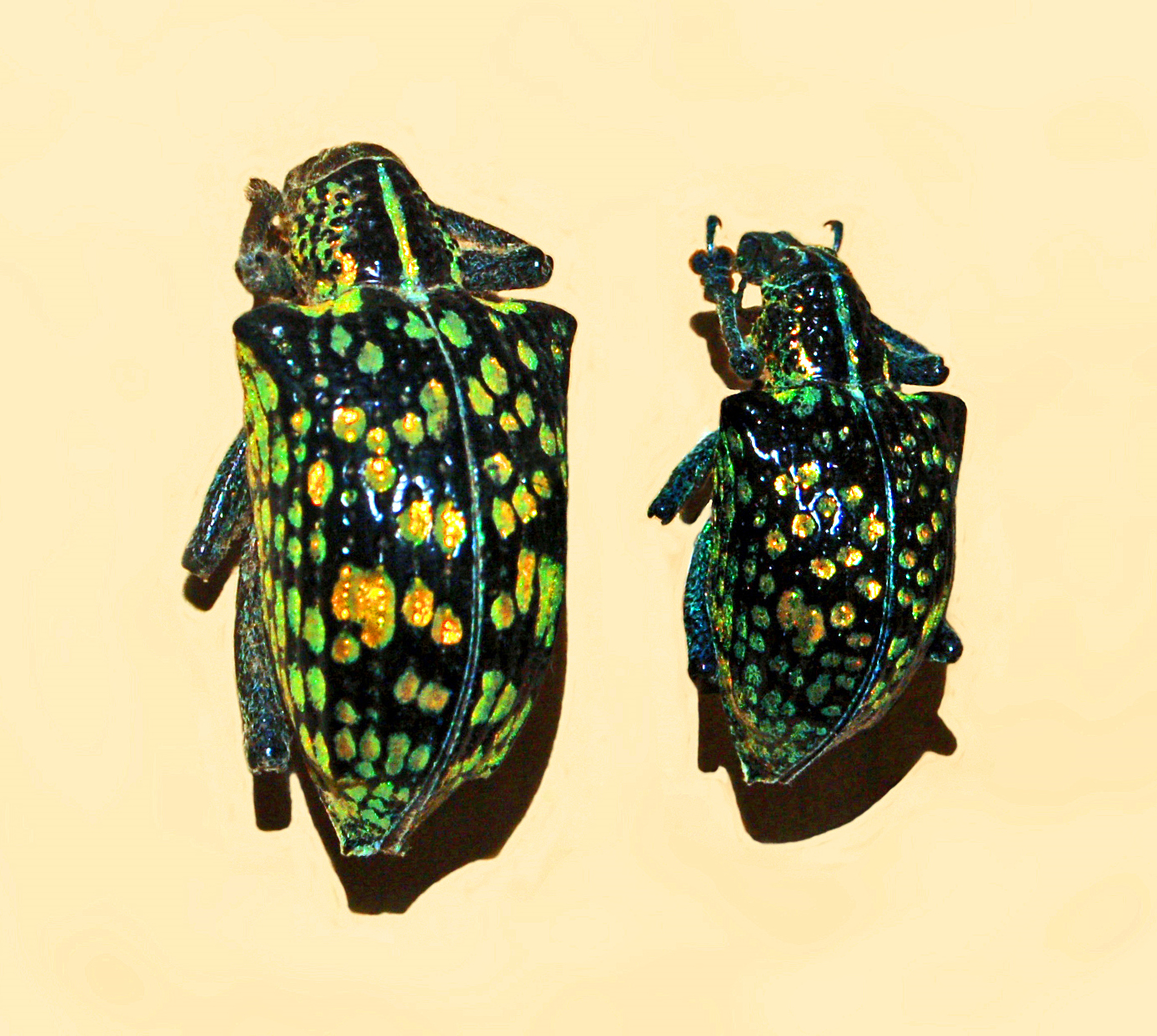
- Entimus splendidus from Brazil

Scientific classification
- Kingdom: Animalia
- Phylum: Arthropoda
- Clade: Pancrustacea
- Class: Insecta
- Order: Coleoptera
- Suborder: Polyphaga
- Infraorder: Cucujiformia
- Superfamily: Curculionoidea
- Family: Curculionidae
- Subfamily: Entiminae
- Tribe: Entimini
- Genus: Entimus
- Species: E. splendidus

Binomial name
- Entimus splendidus (Fabricius 1792)

Synonyms
- Curculio splendidus Fabricius, 1792; Entimus fastuosus Olivier, 1790

= Entimus splendidus =

Species of beetle

Entimus splendidus is a species of broad-nosed weevils belonging to the family true weevil and the Entiminae subfamily.

== Description ==
Entimus splendidus can reach a length of about 21–26 millimetres (0.83–1.02 in). The basic colour is black. Elytra are strongly convex and laterally compressed, punctured with longitudinal rows of brilliant golden-green dots.

== Distribution ==
This rare species can be found in Brazil.
