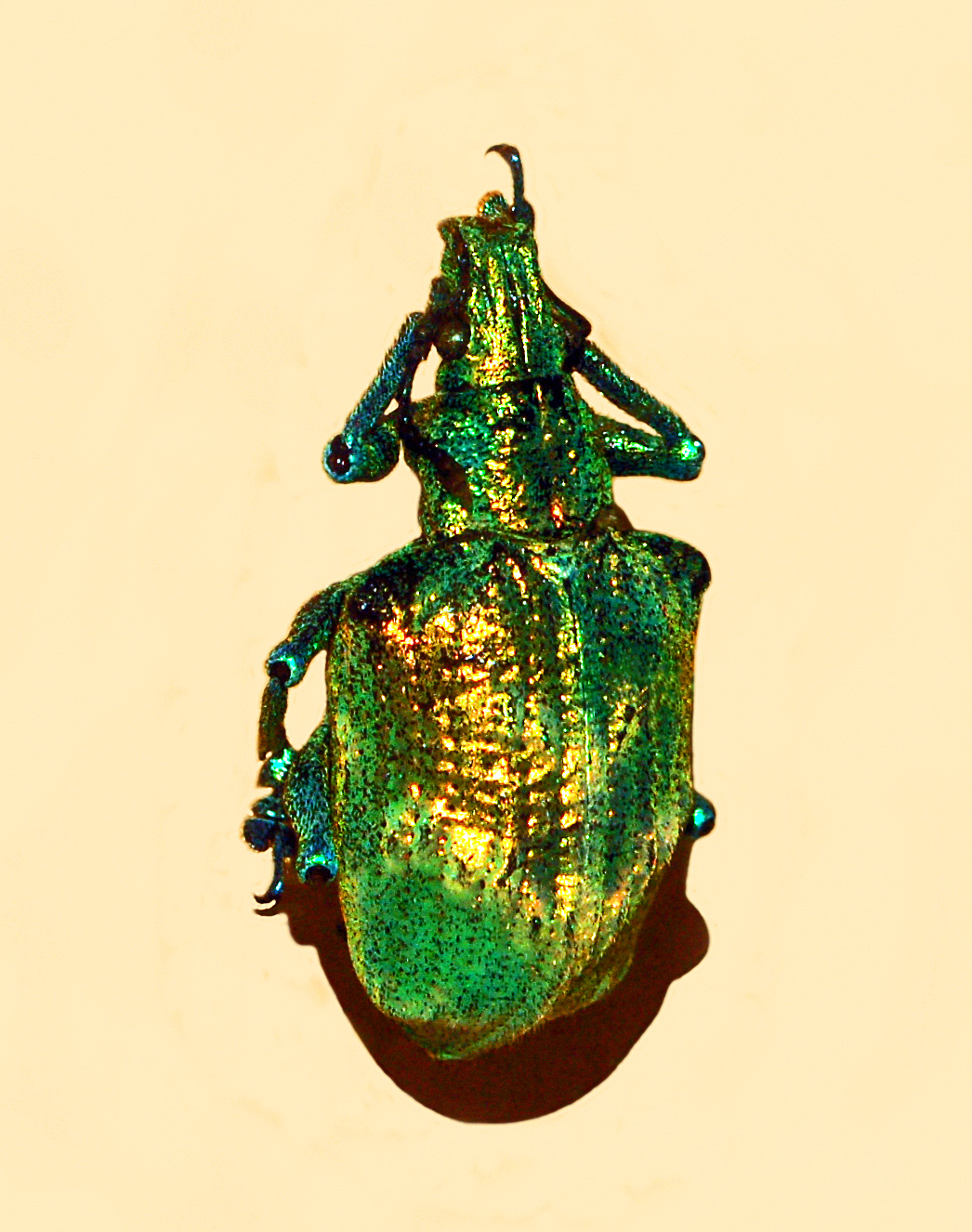
- Lamprocyphus augustus from Brazil

Scientific classification
- Kingdom: Animalia
- Phylum: Arthropoda
- Class: Insecta
- Order: Coleoptera
- Suborder: Polyphaga
- Infraorder: Cucujiformia
- Family: Curculionidae
- Genus: Lamprocyphus
- Species: L. augustus

Binomial name
- Lamprocyphus augustus (Illiger, 1801)

Synonyms
- Curculio augustus Illiger, 1801/1802; Briarius augustus (Illiger, 1801); Cyphus varnhageni Germar, 1823

= Lamprocyphus augustus =

Species of beetle

Lamprocyphus augustus, alternatively Briarius augustus, is a species of the true weevil, family Curculionidae.

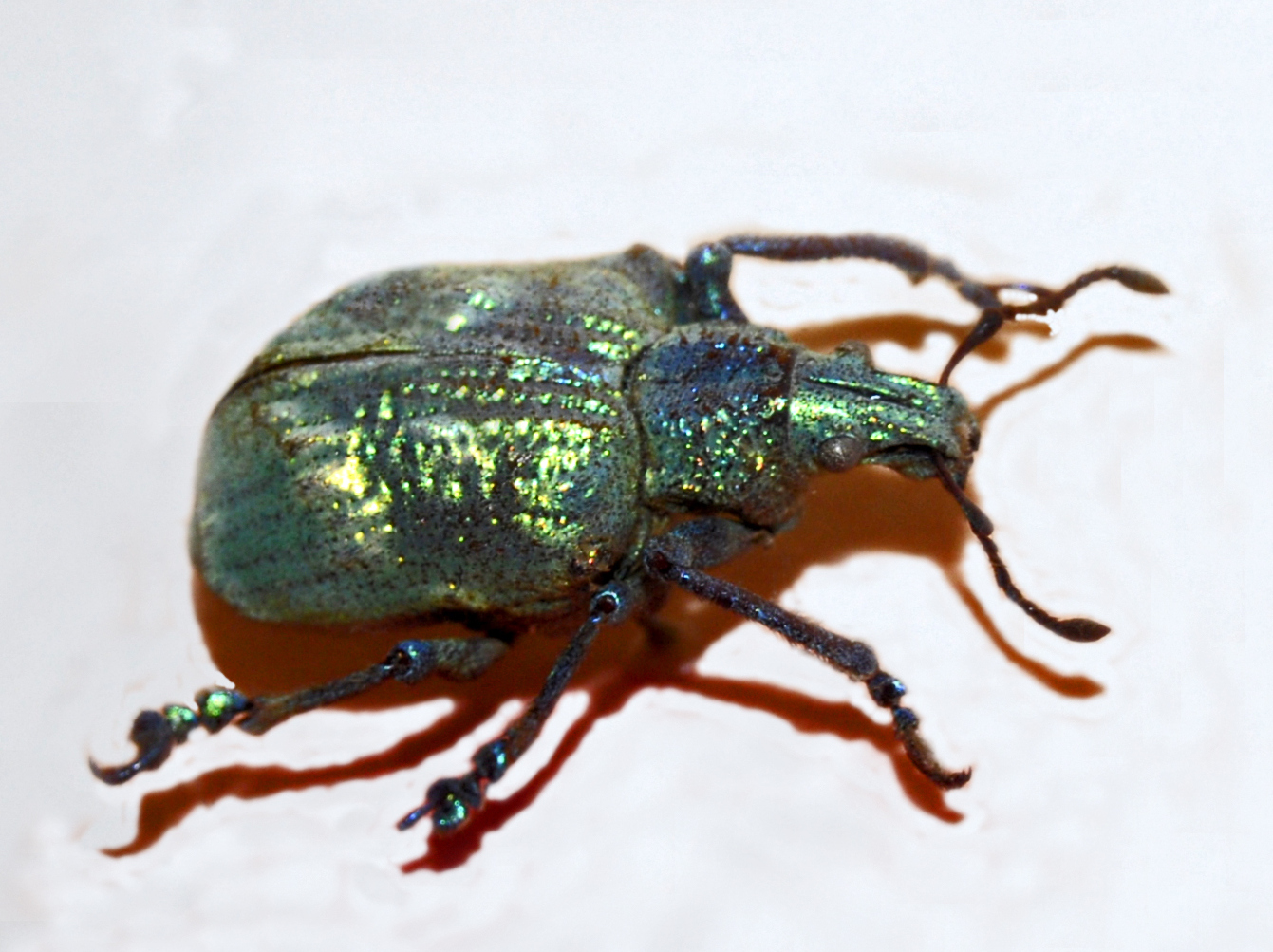
Lamprocyphus augustus

== Description ==
Lamprocyphus augustus females measure 22–29 mm (0.87–1.14 in) and males 19–24 mm (0.75–0.94 in) in length.

=== Photonic crystals ===
The iridescent green with golden reflections is a structural colour. It is created by the photonic crystal structure of its chitin scales.

== Distribution ==
This species occurs in Brazil, Paraguay, and northern Argentina.
