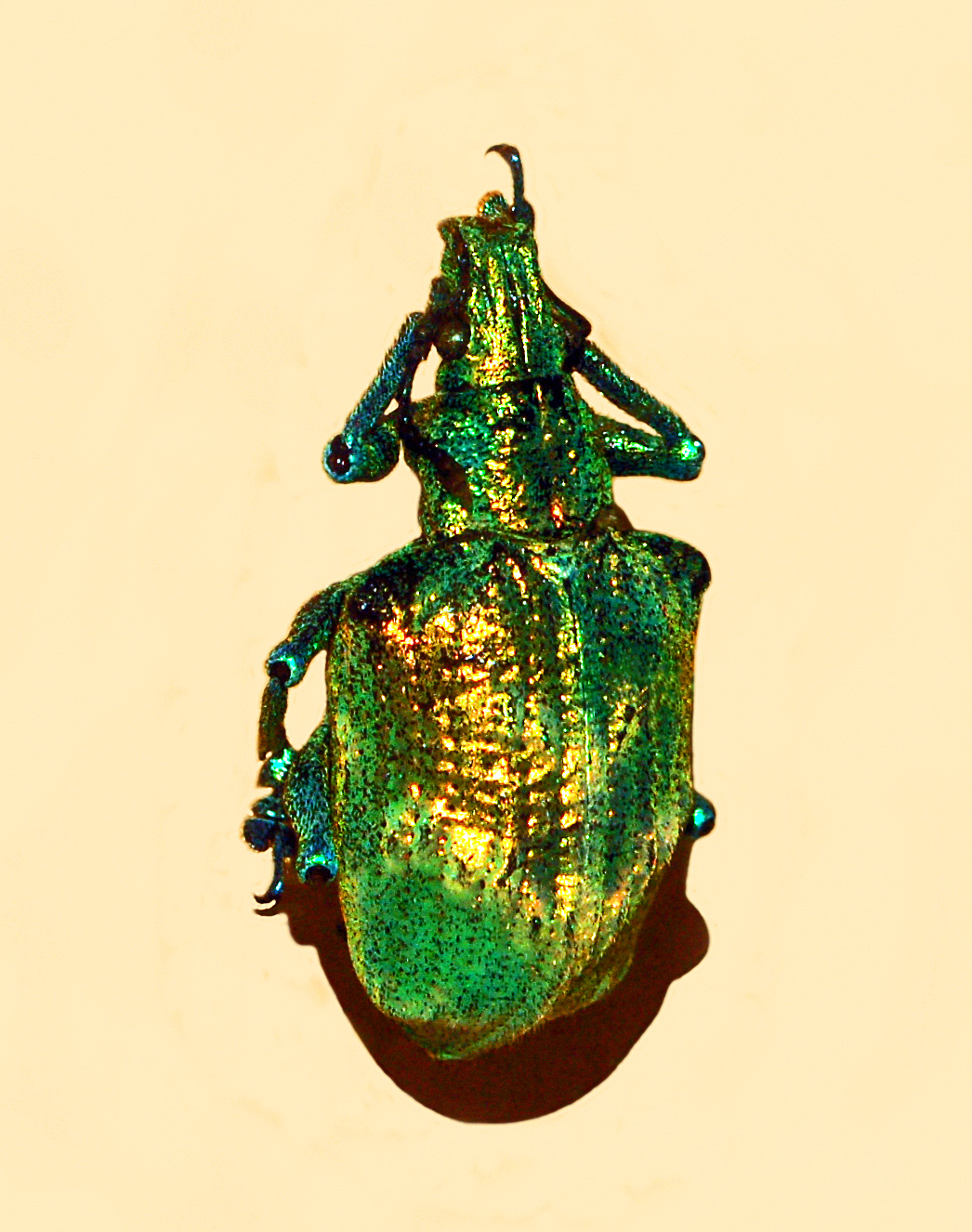
- Lamprocyphus augustus from Brazil

Scientific classification
- Kingdom: Animalia
- Phylum: Arthropoda
- Clade: Pancrustacea
- Class: Insecta
- Order: Coleoptera
- Suborder: Polyphaga
- Infraorder: Cucujiformia
- Superfamily: Curculionoidea
- Family: Curculionidae
- Tribe: Naupactini
- Genus: Lamprocyphus; Marshall, 1922

= Lamprocyphus =

Genus of beetles

Lamprocyphus is a genus of true weevil family.

== List of selected species ==
- Lamprocyphus augustus (Illiger)
- Lamprocyphus consularis (Chevrolat)
- Lamprocyphus elegans (Roelofs)
- Lamprocyphus germari (Boheman, 1833)
- Lamprocyphus gloriandus (Schoenherr)
- Lamprocyphus margaritaceus (Sturm)
- Lamprocyphus oliveirae (Roelofs)
- Lamprocyphus spixi (Perty, 1833)
- Lamprocyphus varnhageni (Germar)
