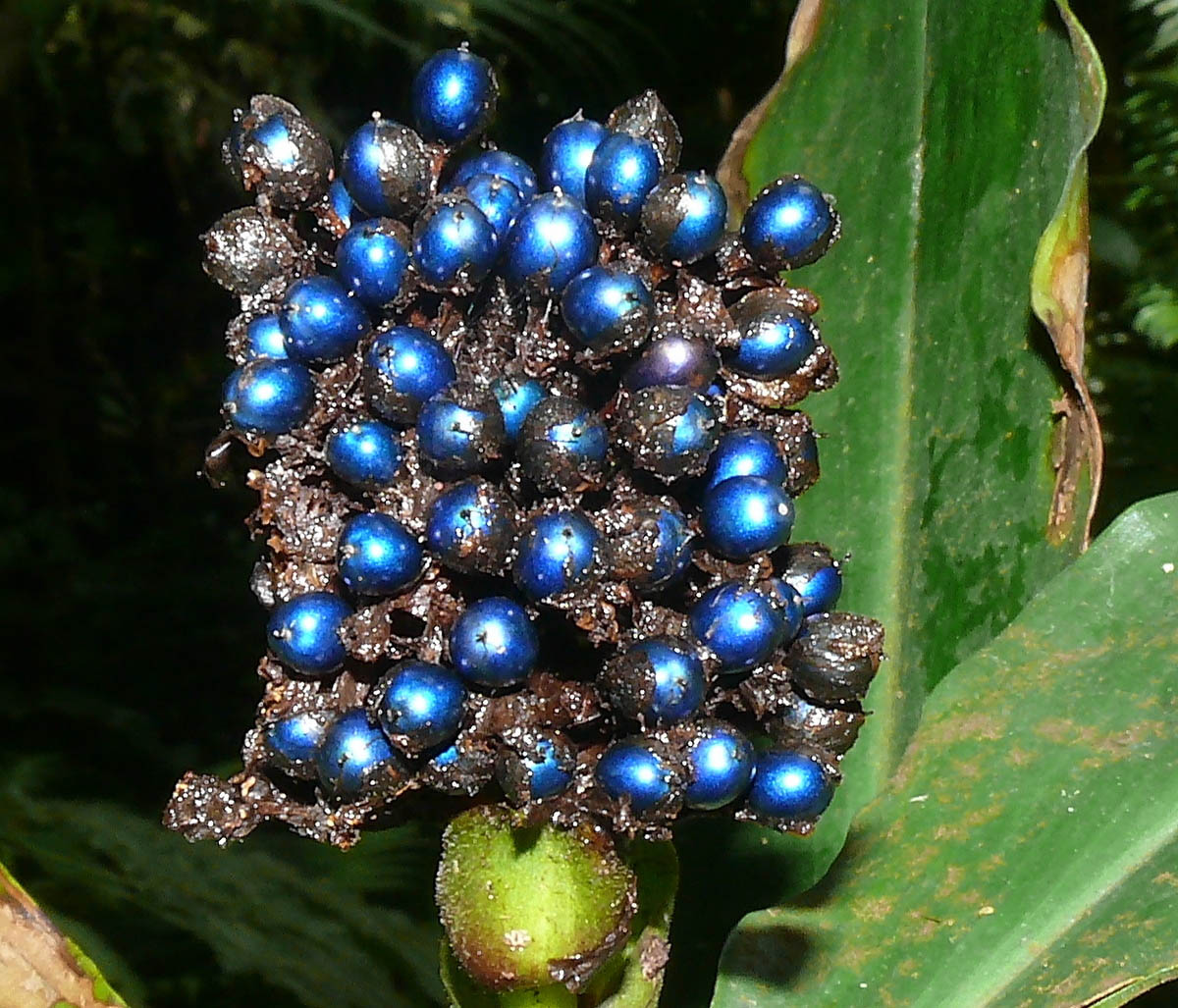

Scientific classification
- Kingdom: Plantae
- Clade: Tracheophytes
- Clade: Angiosperms
- Clade: Monocots
- Clade: Commelinids
- Order: Commelinales
- Family: Commelinaceae
- Genus: Pollia
- Species: P. condensata

Binomial name
- Pollia condensata C.B.Clarke

Synonyms
- Aclisia condensata (C.B.Clarke) G.Brückn.

= Pollia condensata =

Species of flowering plant in the family Commelinaceae

Pollia condensata, sometimes called the marble berry, is a perennial herbaceous plant with stoloniferous stems and hard, dry, shiny, round, metallic-looking blue fruit. It is found in forested regions of Africa. The blue colour of the fruit, created by structural coloration, is the most intense of any known biological material.

== Description ==
The plant was originally described from Angola, in southern Africa. It has large, smooth, narrow leaves, and pale pink or whitish flowers on a stem about 60 cm high. The fruit capsule is about 4 mm in diameter.

== Structural coloration ==
The surface of the Pollia fruit has an especially smooth and transparent cuticle which reflects light as a mirror does (specular reflection). Beneath this glossy surface lies a special layer of cells which have an elaborate but unpigmented microstructure, whose function is to reflect light within a narrow range of wavelengths. This structural coloration is created by Bragg reflection from spirally stacked cellulose microfibrils in the walls of these cells. The wavelength reflected depends on the height of the stack, which varies from cell to cell. Variability in the stack height allows more overall light to be reflected and this further enhances the glossy appearance, but it makes the fruit appear somewhat pixelated.

In addition to simply reflecting light of a specific wavelength, the helicoid structure also causes light of other wavelengths to be modified so that the wavelength converges to within a narrow range before being reflected, which acts to amplify the light at that specific wavelength. This process of constructive interference produces the most intense coloration of any living organism. The total reflectivity is about 30% of that of a silvered glass mirror, and is the highest of any known biological material. The intense coloration makes the fruit attractive to some birds despite having no nutritional value. The birds sometimes decorate their nest with the berries, which over the long term helps to disperse the seeds.

According to materials scientist Ullrich Steiner, who led the team which carried out the original research on structural color in plants, Structural colors come about not by pigments that absorb light, but the way transparent material is arranged on the surface of a substance ... light bounces off the interface ... between each of these layers ... The more layers you stack up, the better defined the color is. The brightness and color purity we see in the fruit comes from the fact that many, many layers add up to produce these very strong reflective characteristics of just one wavelength. ... This fruit is one of the first known examples in plants. We compared it with some other structural colors, such as the morpho butterfly wing... This is stronger.
