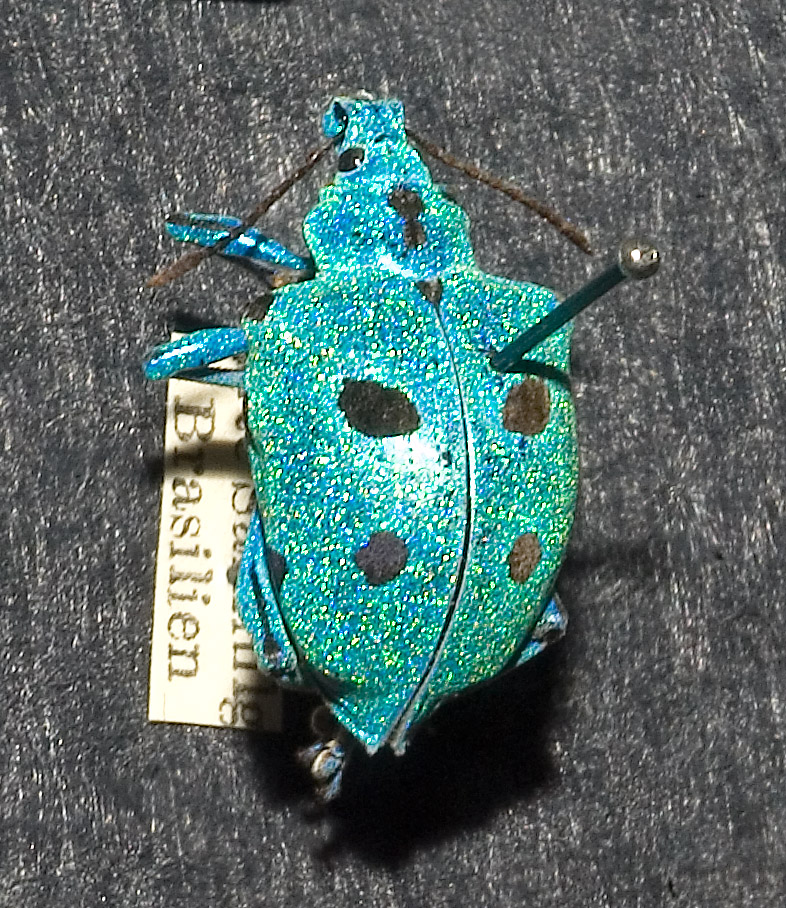
- Polyteles coelestina

Scientific classification
- Kingdom: Animalia
- Phylum: Arthropoda
- Class: Insecta
- Order: Coleoptera
- Suborder: Polyphaga
- Infraorder: Cucujiformia
- Family: Curculionidae
- Subfamily: Entiminae
- Tribe: Entimini
- Genus: Polyteles (Germar,1829)

= Polyteles =

Subfamily of beetles

Polyteles is a South American genus of broad-nosed weevils in the subfamily Entiminae, tribe Entimini. There are seven described species distributed in Argentina, Bolivia, Brazil, Ecuador, Paraguay, Peru, and Uruguay.

A key to identify the genus among the Entimini was published by Vanin and Gaiger in 2005.

== Species ==
Polyteles has four species, all of which are listed below:

- Polyteles atrox (Germar, 1824: 438): Brazil.
- Polyteles decussatus Pascoe, 1870: 441: Peru.
- Polyteles guerini Fåhraeus, 1840: 743: Argentina, Bolivia, Brazil, Paraguay, Uruguay.
- Polyteles inka (Heller, 1932: 2): Ecuador, Peru.
- Polyteles setosus Kirsch, 1874: 393: Peru
- Polyteles stevenii (Schönherr, 1826: 82): Argentina, Bolivia, Brazil, Paraguay.
- Polyteles uniformis (Heller, 1932: 2): Bolivia.
