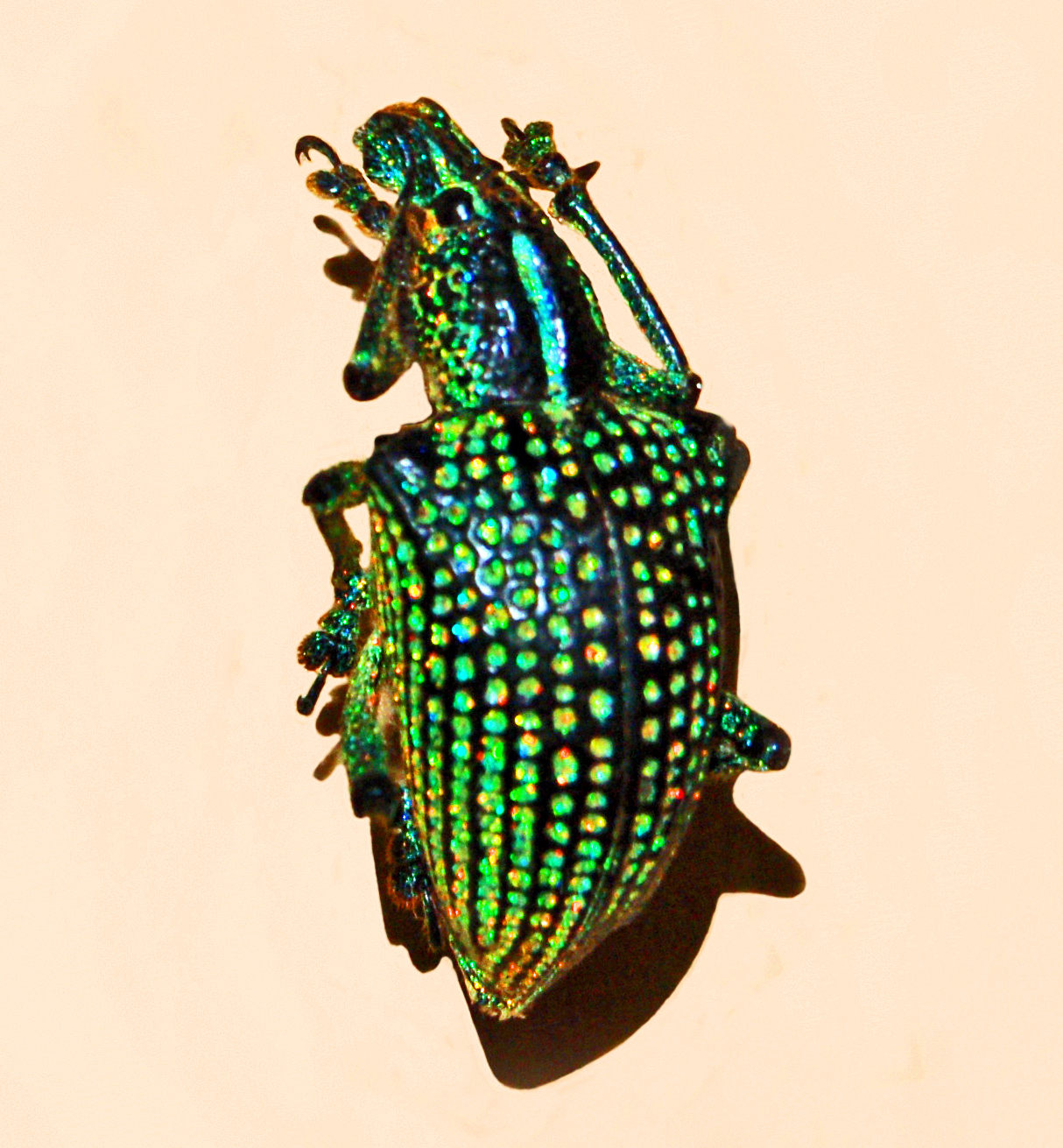
- Entimus imperialis from Brazil

Scientific classification
- Domain: Eukaryota
- Kingdom: Animalia
- Phylum: Arthropoda
- Class: Insecta
- Order: Coleoptera
- Suborder: Polyphaga
- Infraorder: Cucujiformia
- Family: Curculionidae
- Subfamily: Entiminae
- Tribe: Entimini
- Genus: Entimus; Germar, E.F., 1817
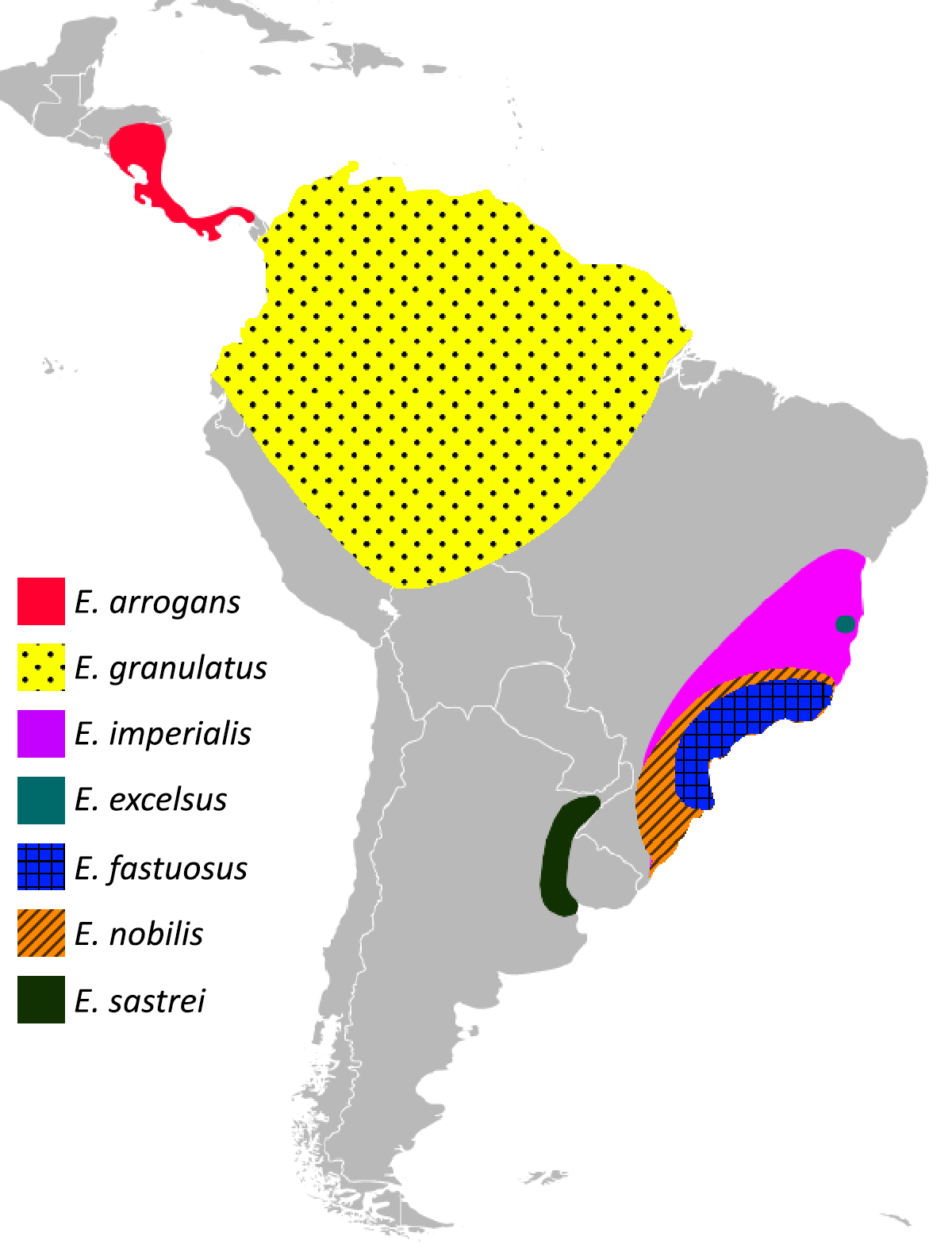
- Geographical distribution of the species of Entimus

= Entimus =

Genus of beetles

Entimus is a genus of broad-nosed weevils belonging to the family true weevil and the Entiminae subfamily.

== Description ==
The species of the genus Entimus can reach a length of about 12–45 millimetres (0.47–1.77 in). They usually have green, blue and gold iridescent scales.

== Distribution ==
These species can be found from Mesoamerica to northeastern Argentina.

== List of species & taxonomy ==
This genus includes the following eight species:

- Entimus arrogans Pascoe, F.P., 1872
- Entimus granulatus (Linnaeus, 1758)
- Entimus imperialis (Forster, 1771)
- Entimus excelsus (Viana. 1958)
- Entimus serpafilhoi Morrone, Abadie and Godinho Jr., 2019
- Entimus nobilis Olivier, 1790
- Entimus splendidus Fabricius 1792 - synonym Entimus fastuosus Olivier, 1790
- Entimus sastrei Viana 1958

The following cladogram represents the diversification of Entimus genus according phylogenetic analysis based on external morphology. It shows two vicariant events, where E. arrogans (Mesoamerican) diverged from South American species. Later, E. granulatus (Amazonian).

- Phaedropus
- Entimus
  - E. arrogans
  - - E. granulatus
    - - - E. fastuosus
        - E. sastrei
      - - E. imperialis
        - - E. serpafilhoi
          - - E. nobilis
            - E. excelsus

== See also ==
- Wtaxa
- Virtual Beetles
