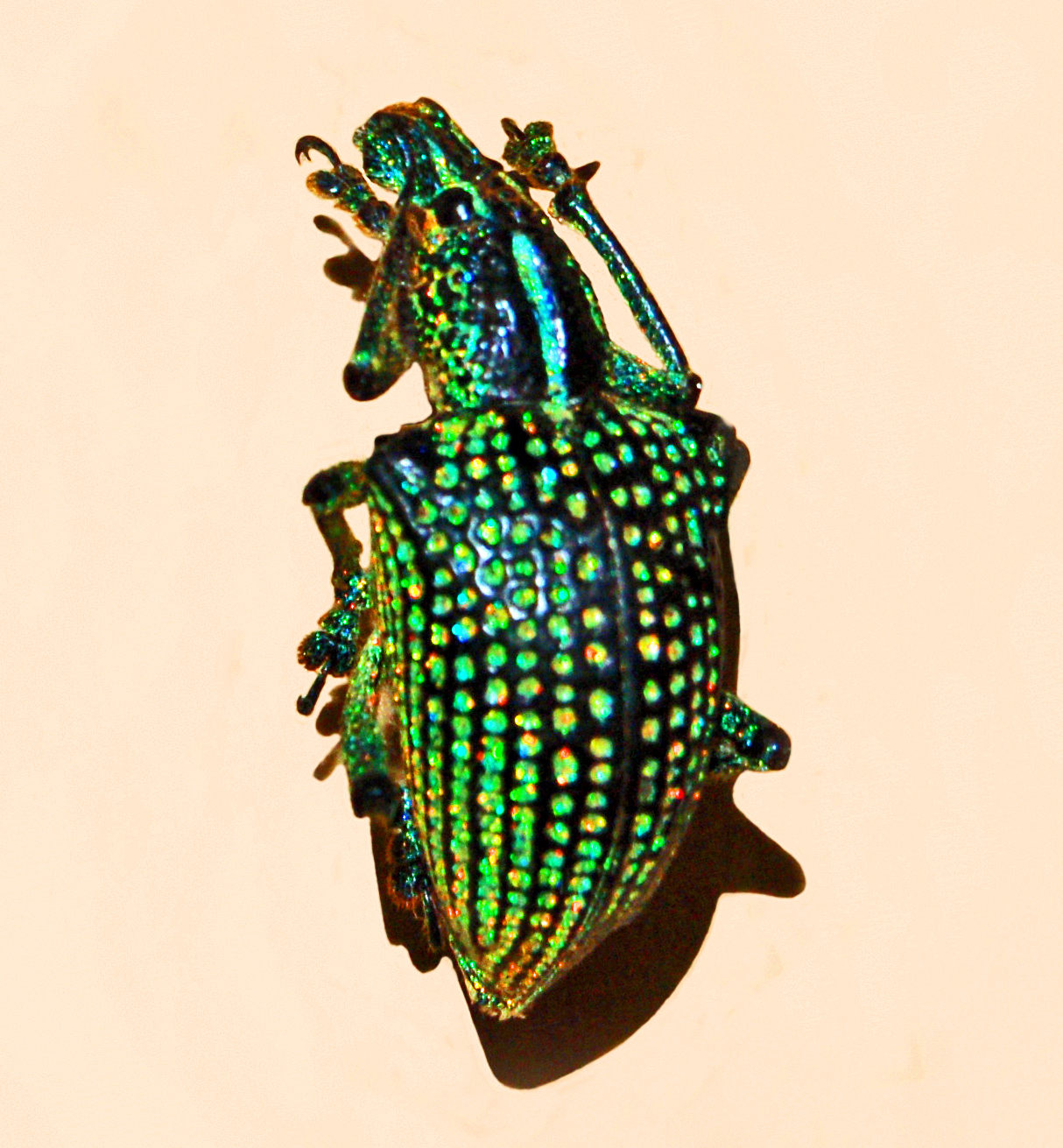
- Entimus imperialis from Brazil

Scientific classification
- Kingdom: Animalia
- Phylum: Arthropoda
- Clade: Pancrustacea
- Class: Insecta
- Order: Coleoptera
- Suborder: Polyphaga
- Infraorder: Cucujiformia
- Superfamily: Curculionoidea
- Family: Curculionidae
- Subfamily: Entiminae
- Tribe: Entimini; Schönherr, 1823

Genera
- See text

= Entimini =

Tribe of beetles

Entimini is a Neotropical weevil tribe in the subfamily Entiminae that includes 46 described species.

Most members of the tribe can be recognized by their relatively large and robust bodies. A key to identify the genera of Entimini can be found in Vanin & Gaiger. The Central American species are treated by Sharp & Champion,

== Distribution ==
The tribe ranges from Mexico to Argentina, with no representatives in the Caribbean islands. All genera are mainly represented in Brazil.

== Genera ==
- Cydianerus
- Cyriophthalmus
- Entimus
- Phaedropus
- Polyteles
- Rhigus
- Trachyus
