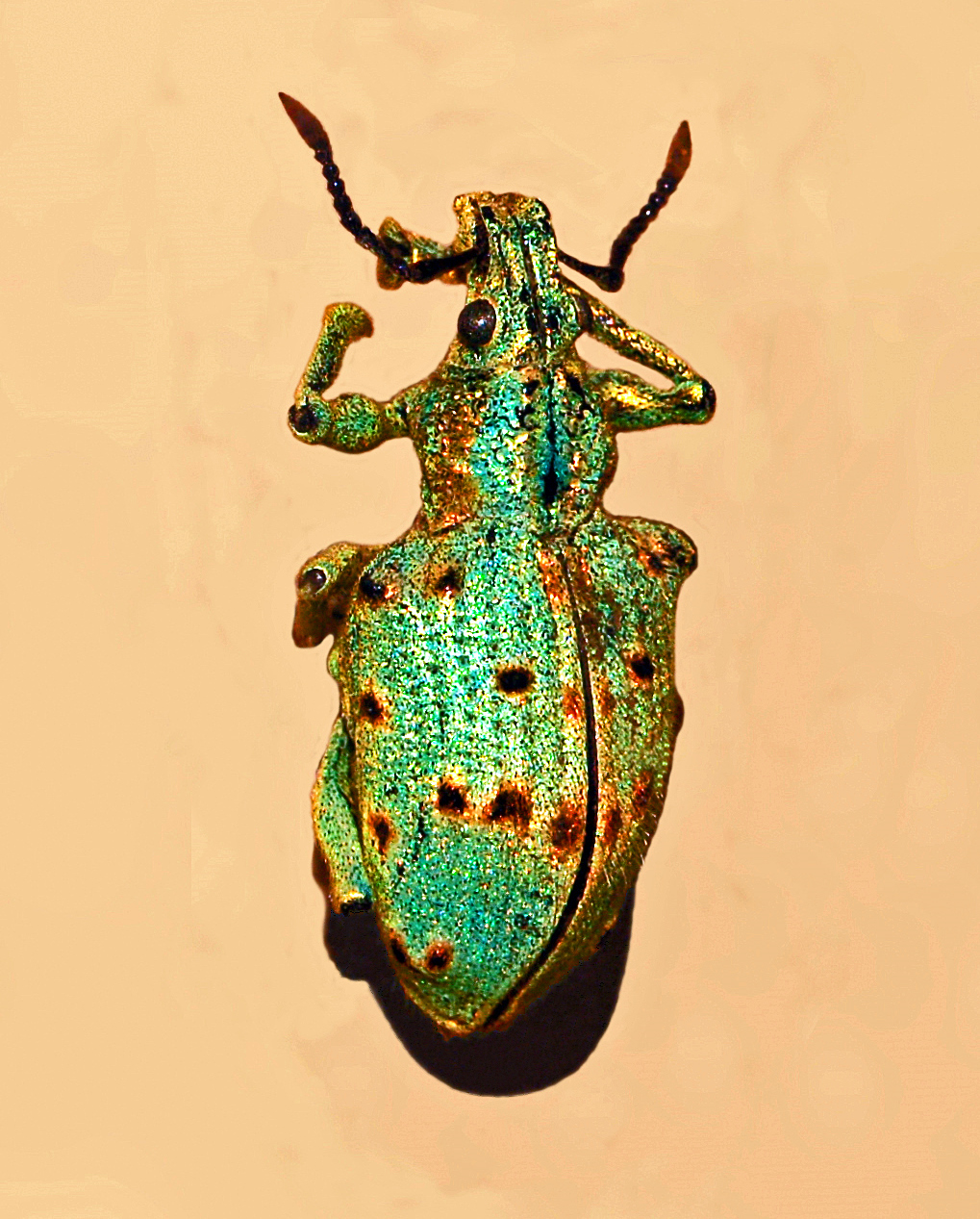
- Lamprocyphus germari from Brazil

Scientific classification
- Kingdom: Animalia
- Phylum: Arthropoda
- Clade: Pancrustacea
- Class: Insecta
- Order: Coleoptera
- Suborder: Polyphaga
- Infraorder: Cucujiformia
- Superfamily: Curculionoidea
- Family: Curculionidae
- Genus: Lamprocyphus
- Species: L. germari

Binomial name
- Lamprocyphus germari (Boheman, 1833)

Synonyms
- Cyphus germari (Boheman 1833)

= Lamprocyphus germari =

Species of beetle

Lamprocyphus germari is a species of the true weevil family.

== Description ==
Lamprocyphus germari can reach a length of about 23 millimetres (0.91 in). This rare beetle is glossy, light green, with black spots surrounded by coppery scales.

== Distribution ==
This species occurs in Brazil.

== Etymology ==
The species name honours Ernst Friedrich Germar.
