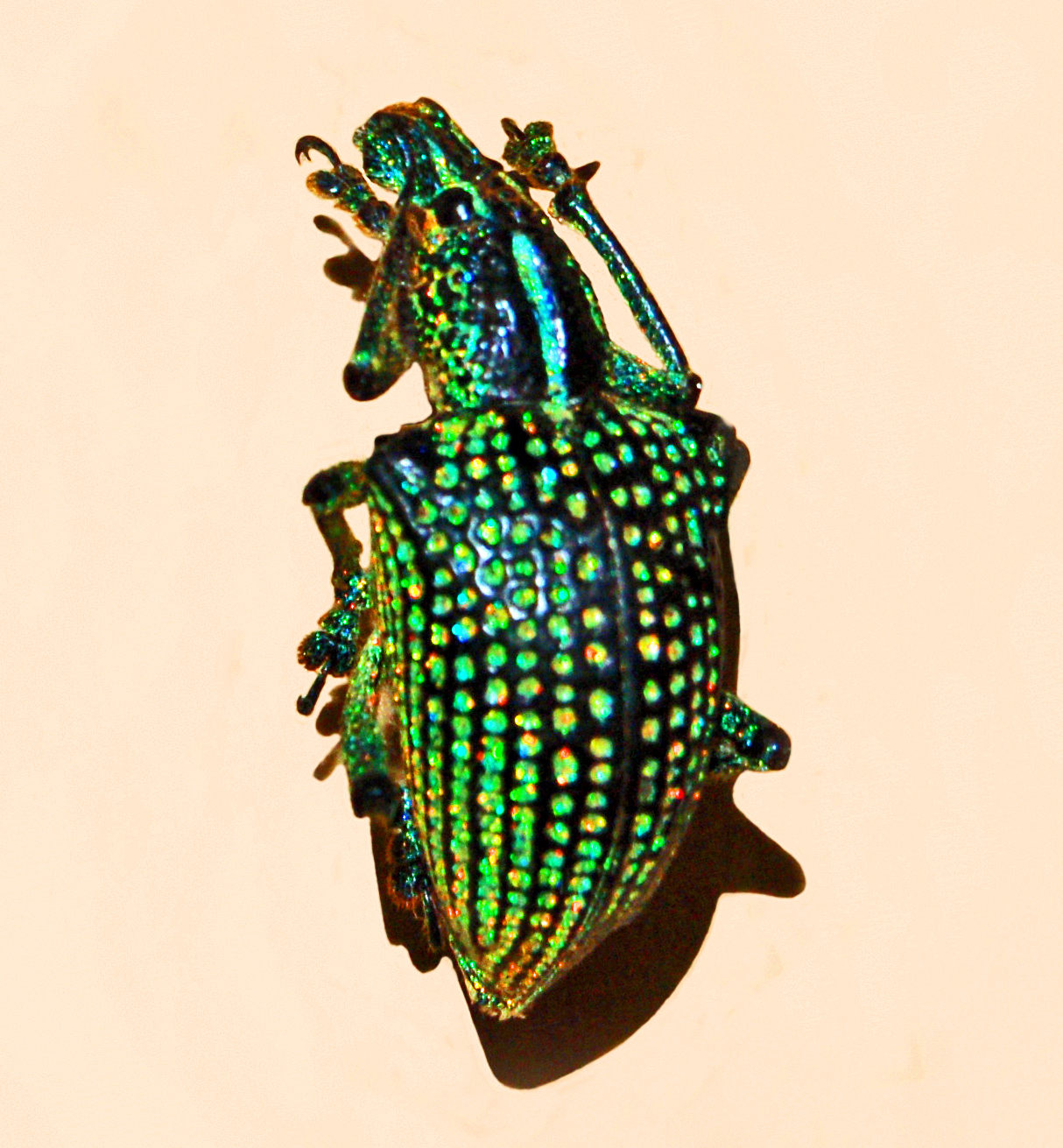
- Entimus imperialis from Brazil

Scientific classification
- Kingdom: Animalia
- Phylum: Arthropoda
- Clade: Pancrustacea
- Class: Insecta
- Order: Coleoptera
- Suborder: Polyphaga
- Infraorder: Cucujiformia
- Superfamily: Curculionoidea
- Family: Curculionidae
- Genus: Entimus
- Species: E. imperialis

Binomial name
- Entimus imperialis (Forster, 1771)

= Entimus imperialis =

Brazilian diamond beetle

Species of beetle

Entimus imperialis, common name Brazilian diamond beetle, is a species of broad-nosed weevils belonging to the family true weevil and the Entiminae subfamily.

== Description ==
Entimus imperialis can reach a length of about 16–30 millimetres (0.63–1.18 in). The basic colour is black. Elytra are strongly convex and laterally compressed, punctured with longitudinal rows of golden-green dots, filled with scales composed by crystals of chitin and resembling little diamonds (hence the common name). Diamond beetles are also used for ladies' jewelry.

The scales of Entimus imperialis appears iridescent (i.e., exhibit colour changes with viewing angle) because of the presence of three-dimensional photonic crystals. This characteristics is probably used as a camouflage and to facilitate intersexual recognition.

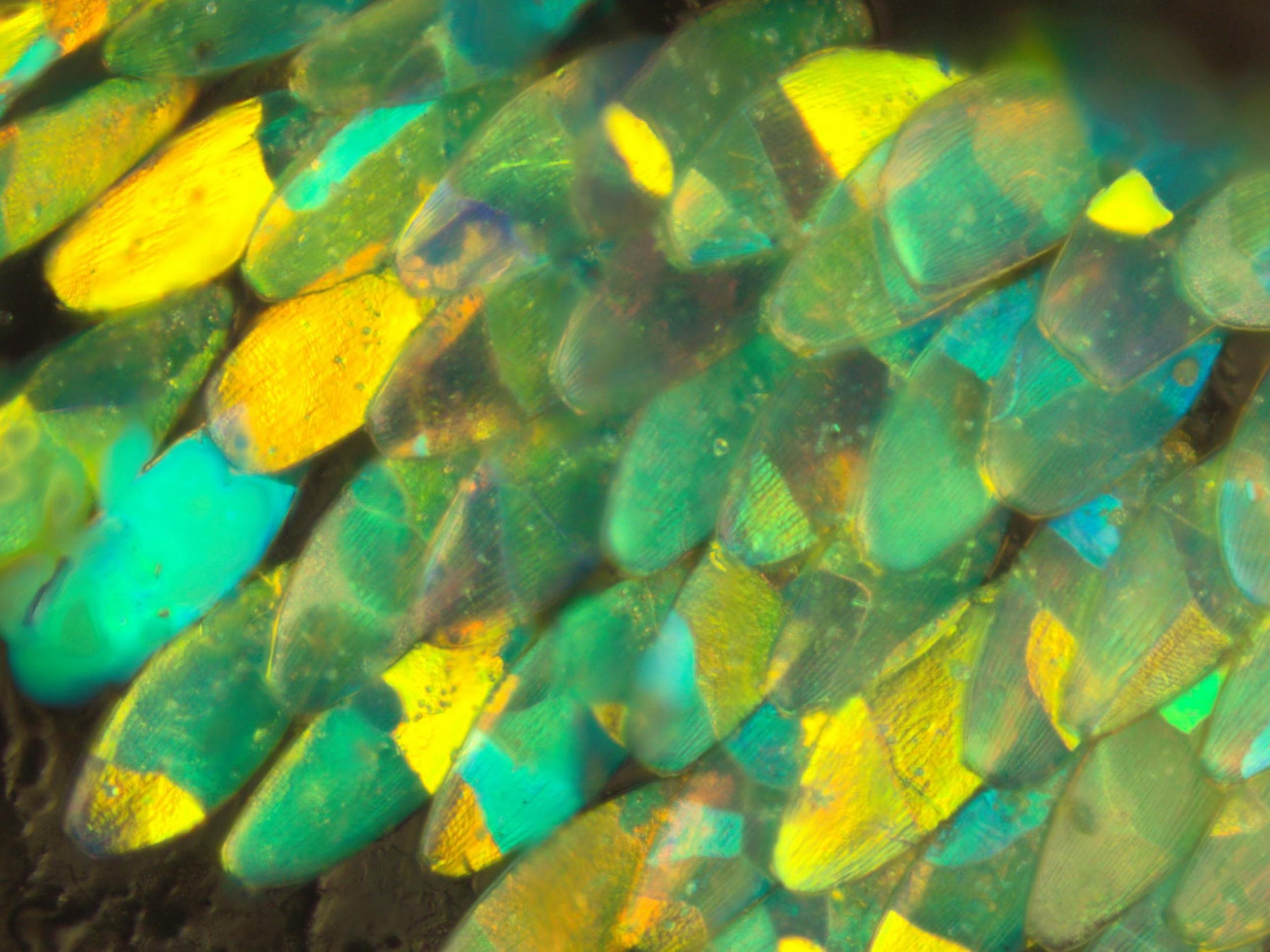
Iridescent scales on Entimus imperialis

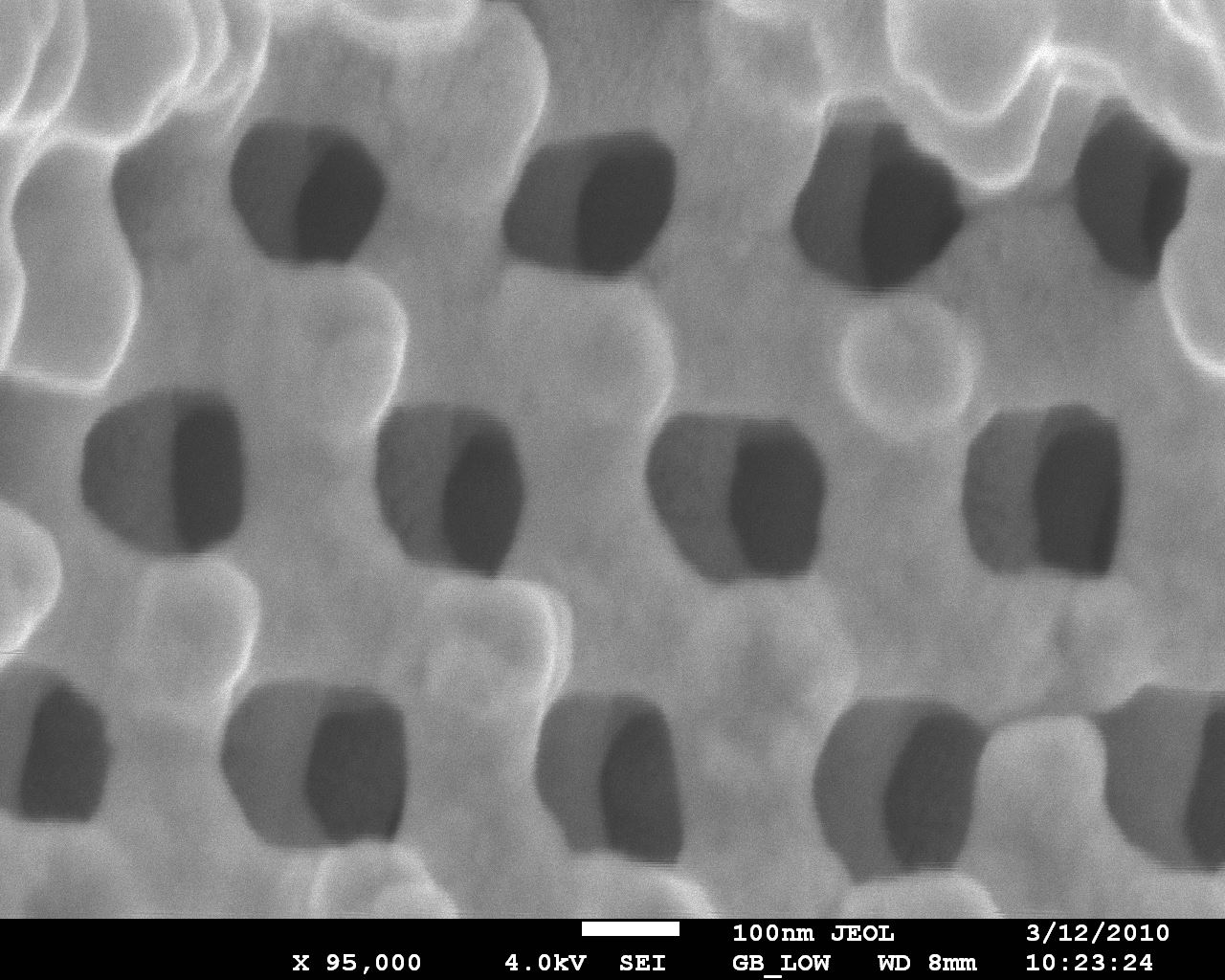
Electron micrograph of the three-dimensional photonic crystals within the scales on Entimus imperialis

== Distribution ==
This species can be found in southwest Brazil as an endemic species.
