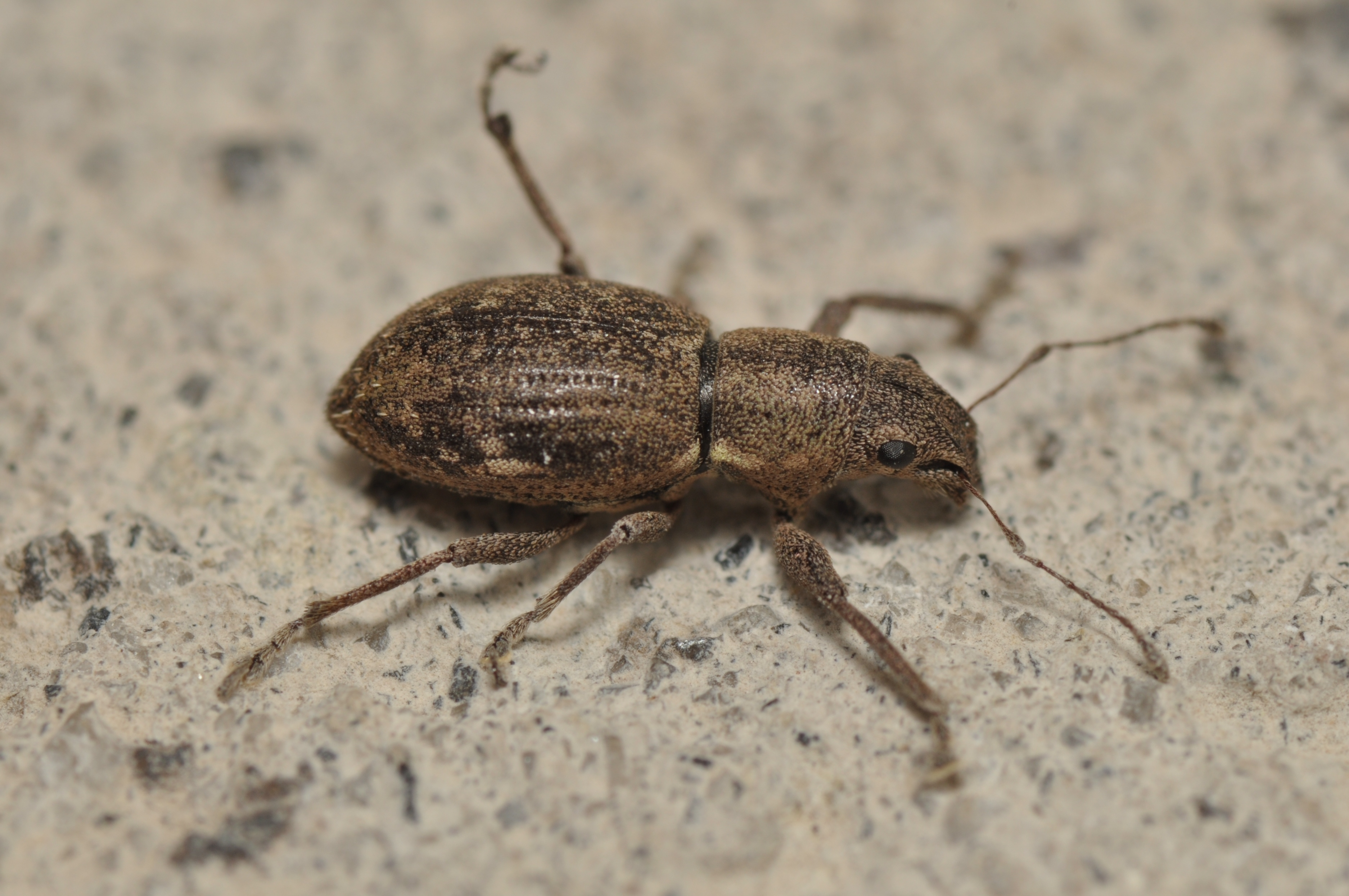
- Naupactus cervinus

Scientific classification
- Kingdom: Animalia
- Phylum: Arthropoda
- Clade: Pancrustacea
- Class: Insecta
- Order: Coleoptera
- Suborder: Polyphaga
- Infraorder: Cucujiformia
- Superfamily: Curculionoidea
- Family: Curculionidae
- Subfamily: Entiminae
- Tribe: Naupactini; Gistel, 1848

Genera
- See text

= Naupactini =

Tribe of beetles

Naupactini is a tribe of broad-nosed weevils (subfamily Entiminae). Primarily from the Neotropical realm, reaches highest genus and species diversity in South America. Their size varies from 3.5 to 35 mm long, and its colour patterns are diverse. As well many has colourful iridescent scales (bluish, greenish or golden), others show opaque scales or setae, and some are subglabrous. In habitats with sparse vegetation or trees absence, the occurrence of flightlessness and parthenogenesis is frequent.

Females of Naupactini usually lay their eggs between adjoining surfaces (e.g. in litter between fallen leaves, in cracks in the soil, and in crevices of tree trunks and calices of fruits), in batches covered by an adhesive substance (Marvaldi, 1999). Their ectophytic larvae live in soil where they feed externally on the roots of their host plants (Marvaldi et al., 2002, 2014; Oberprieler et al., 2014). Although naupactine weevils are capable of eating a large range of different foods, the majority of them show at least some preference for certain plant families, especially Fabaceae (Lanteri et al., 2002). Several species are considered agricultural pests in both their native ranges and places where they have been introduced due to human activities (Lanteri et al., 2013a).

Due to being agricultural pests in many crops and being considered of major fitosanitary importance, biological control with parasitic nematodes is being developed.

Several studies links parthenogenesis and the presence of parasitoid bacteria Wolbachia. The parasite generates thelytokous parthenogenesis but also other reproductive alterations on the host, increasing its frequency on the population, as the main way of transmission is maternal. Although, Wolbachia's horizontal transfer amongst unrelated invertebrates species is extensive.

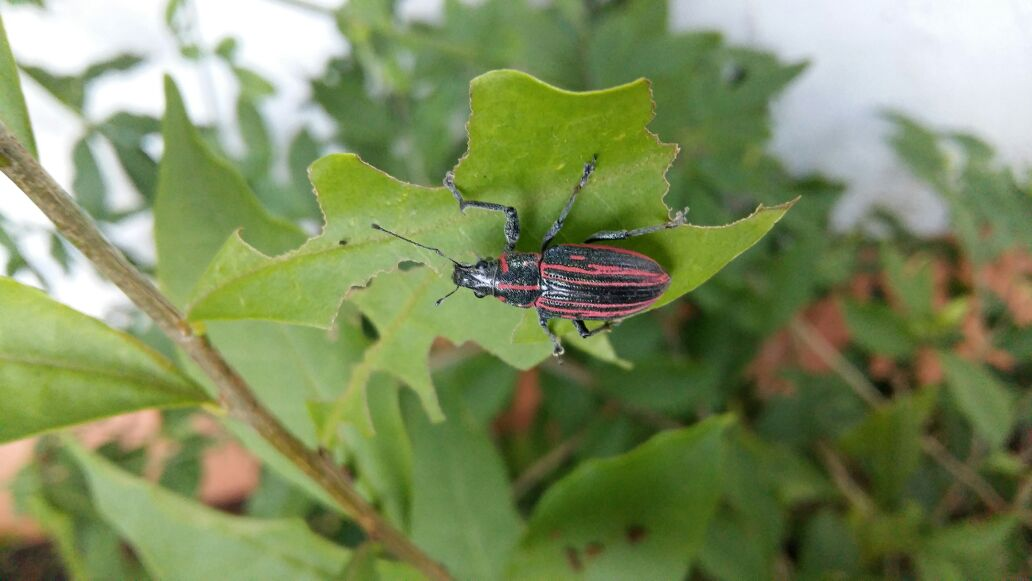
Naupactus rivulosos eating a citrus tree's leaf.

== Genera ==
Acyphus – Alceis – Amitrus – Amphideritus – Aptolemus – Aramigus – Artipus – Asymmathetes – Asynonychus – Atrichonotus – Brachystylodes – Briarius – Chamaelops – Corecaulus – Curiades – Cyphoides – Cyphopsis – Cyrtomon – Enoplopactus – Ericydeus – Eurymetopus – Exophthalmida – Fascaevinus – Galapaganas – Glaphyrometopus – Hadropus – Hoplopactus – Ischnomias – Lamprocyphopsis – Lamprocyphus – Lanterius – Leschenius – Litostylodes – Litostylus – Macrostylus – Megalostylodes – Megalostylus – Melanocyphus – Mendozella – Mesagroicus – Mimographus – Mionarthrus – Moropactus – Myociphus – Naupactus – Neoericydeus – Obrieniolus – Pactorrhinus – Pantomorus – Parapantomorus – Parasynonychus – Parexophthalmus – Phacepholis – Platyomus – Plectrophoroides – Priocyphopsis – Priocyphus – Protonaupactus – Rhynchuchus – Saurops – Squamodontus – Stenocyphus – Teratopactus – Tetragonomus – Thoracocyphus – Trichaptus – Trichocyphus – Trichonaupactus – Wagneriella – ?†Arostropsis

According to Lanteri (2017), the genera Mimographus, Hoplopactus and Naupactus are not monophyletic, Artipus belongs to Geonemini tribe, and Mimographopsis and Floresianus should be resurrected as extant genera.
