= List of Naupactus species =

These 236 species belong to the genus Naupactus, white-fringed weevils.

== Naupactus species ==
- Naupactus acerbus Boheman, 1840^{c g}
- Naupactus aerosus Boheman, 1840^{c g}
- Naupactus agglomeratus Hustache, 1938^{c g}
- Naupactus albidiventris Hustache, 1947^{c g}
- Naupactus albidus Perroud, 1853^{c g}
- Naupactus albolateralis Hustache, 1947^{c g}
- Naupactus albopunctatus Boheman, 1840^{c g}
- Naupactus albovittatus Voss, 1932^{c g}
- Naupactus albulus Boheman, 1833^{c g}
- Naupactus alternevittatus Hustache, 1947^{c g}
- Naupactus ambiguus Boheman, 1840^{c g}
- Naupactus ambitiotus Boheman, 1833^{c g}
- Naupactus amens Boheman, 1833^{c g}
- Naupactus anceps Boheman, 1833^{c g}
- Naupactus ancora Marshall, 1949^{c g}
- Naupactus angulithorax Hustache, 1947^{c g}
- Naupactus annae Bordon, 1997^{c g}
- Naupactus anthribiformis Boheman, 1833^{c g}
- Naupactus aptus Boheman, 1840^{c g}
- Naupactus argentatus Hustache, 1947^{c g}
- Naupactus argenteus Hustache, 1947^{c g}
- Naupactus argentinensis Hustache, 1926^{c g}
- Naupactus argyrostomus Boheman, 1840^{c g}
- Naupactus aulacus Germar, 1824^{c g}
- Naupactus aurichalceus Boheman, 1833^{c g}
- Naupactus auricinctus Boheman, 1833^{c g}
- Naupactus auripes (Hustache, 1947)^{c g}
- Naupactus aurolimbatus Boheman, 1840^{c g}
- Naupactus balteus Voss, 1934^{c g}
- Naupactus barbicauda Boheman, 1840^{c g}
- Naupactus basalis Hustache, 1947^{c g}
- Naupactus basilicus Germar, 1824^{c g}
- Naupactus bellus Boheman, 1833^{c g}
- Naupactus bipes (Germar, 1824)^{c g}
- Naupactus bipunctatus Boheman, 1833^{c g}
- Naupactus bohumilae Bordon, 1997^{c g}
- Naupactus bondari Marshall, 1937^{c g}
- Naupactus bosqi Hustache, 1947^{c g}
- Naupactus brevicrinitus Hustache, 1947^{c g}
- Naupactus breviscapus Hustache, 1947^{c g}
- Naupactus bridgesii C. R. Waterhouse, 1844^{c g}
- Naupactus bruchi (Heller, 1921)^{c g}
- Naupactus brunneus (Hustache, 1947)^{c g}
- Naupactus calumuchitanensis Hustache, 1947^{c g}
- Naupactus camachoi Bordon, 1997^{c g}
- Naupactus carinirostris (Hustache, 1947)^{c g}
- Naupactus caroli Hustache, 1947^{c g}
- Naupactus castaneus Hustache, 1947^{c g}
- Naupactus celator Boheman, 1833^{g}
- Naupactus celutor Boheman, 1833^{c g}
- Naupactus cephalotes (Hustache, 1947)^{c g}
- Naupactus cervinus Boheman, 1840^{c g b} (Fuller rose beetle)
- Naupactus chaconi Bordon, 1997^{c g}
- Naupactus chalybeipes Boheman, 1840^{c g}
- Naupactus chedasi Bordon, 1997^{c g}
- Naupactus chevrolati Boheman, 1833^{c g}
- Naupactus chloraspis Erichson, 1847^{c g}
- Naupactus chloris Hustache, 1947^{c g}
- Naupactus chloropleurus Pascoe, 1881^{c g}
- Naupactus chordinus Boheman, 1833^{c g}
- Naupactus cinerascens Perroud, 1853^{c g}
- Naupactus cinereidorsum Hustache, 1947^{c g}
- Naupactus cinerosus Boheman, 1833^{c g}
- Naupactus clavijoi Bordon, 1997^{c g}
- Naupactus concinnus Boheman, 1840^{c g}
- Naupactus condecoratus Boheman, 1840^{c g}
- Naupactus cupreus Bordon, 1997^{c g}
- Naupactus curialis Germar, 1824^{c g}
- Naupactus curtus Boheman, 1833^{c g}
- Naupactus curvilineus Boheman, 1840^{c g}
- Naupactus cypholdes Heller, 1921^{c g}
- Naupactus dapsilis Perty, 1832^{c g}
- Naupactus decorus (Fabricius, 1775)^{c g}
- Naupactus delicatulus Hustache, 1947^{c g}
- Naupactus denudatus Hustache, 1923^{c g}
- Naupactus deplorabundus Boheman, 1833^{c g}
- Naupactus deses Schoenherr, 1840^{c g}
- Naupactus dissimilis Hustache, 1947^{c g}
- Naupactus dissimulator Boheman, 1840^{c g}
- Naupactus dives Klug, 1829^{c g}
- Naupactus faldermanni Boheman, 1840^{c g}
- Naupactus fatuus Boheman, 1833^{c g}
- Naupactus fernandezi Hustache, 1947^{c g}
- Naupactus fulgerens Lucas, 1857^{c g}
- Naupactus fulvus (Hustache, 1947)^{c g}
- Naupactus fuscus Boheman, 1840^{c g}
- Naupactus glaucus Perty, 1832^{c g}
- Naupactus godmani (Crotch, 1867)^{g} (syn. N. cervinus) (Fuller rose beetle)
- Naupactus habenatus Marshall, 1949^{c g}
- Naupactus hirsuticeps (Hustache, 1947)^{c g}
- Naupactus hirsutus Hustache, 1947^{c g}
- Naupactus hirtellus (Voss, 1932)^{c g}
- Naupactus humilis (Hustache, 1947)^{c g}
- Naupactus hypocrita Germar, 1824^{c g}
- Naupactus illotus Germar, 1824^{c g}
- Naupactus imbellis Hustache, 1947^{c g}
- Naupactus imbutus Pascoe, 1881^{c g}
- Naupactus impurus Boheman, 1833^{c g}
- Naupactus inermis Hustache, 1947^{c g}
- Naupactus insignis Boheman, 1840^{c g}
- Naupactus instabilis Boheman, 1840^{c g}
- Naupactus institor Boheman, 1833^{c g}
- Naupactus interruptus Hustache, 1947^{c g}
- Naupactus jacobi Hustache, 1947^{c g}
- Naupactus jekelii Kirsch, 1874^{c g}
- Naupactus jimbriatus Hustache, 1938^{c g}
- Naupactus jolyi Bordon, 1997^{c g}
- Naupactus lar Germar, 1824^{c g}
- Naupactus laticeps Champion, 1911^{c g}
- Naupactus laticollis Hustache, 1947^{c g}
- Naupactus latifrons Boheman, 1833^{c g}
- Naupactus lattkei Bordon, 1997^{c g}
- Naupactus leucogaster Perty, 1832^{c g}
- Naupactus leucographus Boheman, 1840^{c g}
- Naupactus leucoloma Boh. in Schoenh., 1840^{c g b}
- Naupactus leucophaeus Boheman, 1833^{c g}
- Naupactus lineatus Boheman, 1840^{c g}
- Naupactus litoris Bordon, 1997^{c g}
- Naupactus lizeri Hustache, 1923^{c g}
- Naupactus llanensis Bordon, 1997^{c g}
- Naupactus longimanus (Fabricius, 1775)^{c g}
- Naupactus loripes (Germar, 1824)^{c g}
- Naupactus luteipes (Hustache, 1947)^{c g}
- Naupactus mariaeloisiae Bordon, 1997^{c g}
- Naupactus maritimus Bordon, 1997^{c g}
- Naupactus martinezi Bordon, 1997^{c g}
- Naupactus mimicus Hustache, 1938^{c g}
- Naupactus minor Buchanan, 1942^{c g}
- Naupactus minutellus Wibmer & O'Brien, 1986^{c g}
- Naupactus minutus Hustache, 1938^{c g}
- Naupactus morio Boheman, 1833^{c g}
- Naupactus mulsanti Perroud, 1853^{c g}
- Naupactus navicularis Boheman, 1840^{c g}
- Naupactus navus Marshall, 1949^{c g}
- Naupactus nubilosus Boheman, 1840^{c g}
- Naupactus obsoletus Kirsch, 1874^{c g}
- Naupactus ocami Bordon, 1997^{c g}
- Naupactus ochreonotatus Voss, 1934^{c g}
- Naupactus optatus (Herbst, 1797)^{c g}
- Naupactus opulentus Voss, 1940^{c g}
- Naupactus ornatus Pascoe, 1879^{c g}
- Naupactus ovatus (Hustache, 1947)^{c g}
- Naupactus pallidulus ^{b}
- Naupactus pallidus ^{b}
- Naupactus parallelus Hustache, 1947^{c g}
- Naupactus pedestris Voss, 1934^{c g}
- Naupactus penai Bordon, 1997^{c g}
- Naupactus peregrinus (Buchanan, 1939)^{c g b}
- Naupactus peruvianus Hustache, 1938^{c g}
- Naupactus pictus Boheman, 1840^{c g}
- Naupactus pilipes Hustache, 1947^{c g}
- Naupactus pithecius Germar, 1824^{c g}
- Naupactus plagiatus Lucas, 1857^{c g}
- Naupactus polliger Boheman, 1833^{c g}
- Naupactus postfasciatus (Hustache, 1947)^{c g}
- Naupactus postsignatus Voss, 1940^{c g}
- Naupactus praedatus Erichson, 1847^{c g}
- Naupactus prasinus (Hustache, 1947)^{c g}
- Naupactus prasnius Hustache, 1947^{c g}
- Naupactus proximus Voss, 1934^{c g}
- Naupactus pulchellus Kuschel, 1958^{c g}
- Naupactus pupulus Boheman, 1840^{c g}
- Naupactus purpureoviolaceus Hustache, 1947^{c g}
- Naupactus rivulosus (Olivier, 1790)^{i c g}
- Naupactus rnacilentus Boheman, 1833^{c g}
- Naupactus roborosus Germar, 1824^{c g}
- Naupactus romeroi Bordon, 1997^{c g}
- Naupactus rosalesi Bordon, 1997^{c g}
- Naupactus roscidus Erichson, 1848^{c g}
- Naupactus rubiginosus (Fabricius, 1801)^{c g}
- Naupactus ruficornis Boheman, 1840^{c g}
- Naupactus rugosus Hustache, 1947^{c g}
- Naupactus ruizi Brèthes, 1925^{c g}
- Naupactus sahlbergi Boheman, 1840^{c g}
- Naupactus sanamnsis Bordon, 1997^{c g}
- Naupactus sanfilippoi Bordon, 1997^{c g}
- Naupactus sanguinipes Hustache, 1938^{c g}
- Naupactus santanae Bordon, 1997^{c g}
- Naupactus scelestus Boheman, 1833^{c g}
- Naupactus schapleri Hustache, 1947^{c g}
- Naupactus schnusei Voss, 1954^{c g}
- Naupactus sellatus Boheman, 1840^{c g}
- Naupactus serenus Pascoe, 1881^{c g}
- Naupactus sericellus Hustache, 1947^{c g}
- Naupactus sericeus Hustache, 1947^{c g}
- Naupactus serieguttatus Rheinheimer, 2008^{g}
- Naupactus setarius Boheman, 1833^{c g}
- Naupactus sexmaculatus Lucas, 1857^{c g}
- Naupactus signatus Blanchard, 1847^{c g}
- Naupactus signipennis Boheman, 1840^{c g}
- Naupactus similis (Hustache, 1947)^{c g}
- Naupactus simulator Voss, 1954^{c g}
- Naupactus sommeri Boheman, 1840^{c g}
- Naupactus sparsus Boheman, 1840^{c g}
- Naupactus stauropterus Germar, 1824^{c g}
- Naupactus stigmaticus Boheman, 1840^{c g}
- Naupactus subacutus Boheman, 1840^{c g}
- Naupactus submaculatus Hustache, 1947^{c g}
- Naupactus sulcipes Hustache, 1947^{c g}
- Naupactus sulfuratus Champion, 1911^{c g}
- Naupactus sulphureoviridis Hustache, 1938^{c g}
- Naupactus sulphurfer Pascoe, 1881^{c g}
- Naupactus suturalis Boheman, 1840^{c g}
- Naupactus tachirensis Bordon, 1997^{c g}
- Naupactus tarsalis Boheman, 1840^{c g}
- Naupactus tesselatus ^{b}
- Naupactus transversus Boheman, 1840^{c g}
- Naupactus tremolerasi Hustache, 1947^{c g}
- Naupactus tucumanensis Hustache, 1947^{c g}
- Naupactus umbrinus Hustache, 1947^{c g}
- Naupactus univittatus Boheman, 1833^{c g}
- Naupactus variegatus Hustache, 1938^{c g}
- Naupactus variesignatus Voss, 1951^{c g}
- Naupactus velox (Fabricius, 1787)^{c g}
- Naupactus venezolanus Hustache, 1938^{c g}
- Naupactus verecundus Hustache, 1947^{c g}
- Naupactus versatilis Hustache, 1947^{c g}
- Naupactus vianai Hustache, 1947^{c g}
- Naupactus viduatus Boheman, 1840^{c g}
- Naupactus vilme Bordon, 1997^{c g}
- Naupactus viloriui Bordon, 1997^{c g}
- Naupactus virens Boheman, 1840^{c g}
- Naupactus virescens Champion, 1911^{c g}
- Naupactus viridepunctatus Rheinheimer, 2011^{c g}
- Naupactus viridicinctus Boheman, 1833^{c g}
- Naupactus viridicyaneus Hustache, 1947^{c g}
- Naupactus viridimarginalis Hustache, 1947^{c g}
- Naupactus viridimicans Hustache, 1923^{c g}
- Naupactus viridinitens Hustache, 1947^{c g}
- Naupactus viridiplaptus Boheman, 1840^{c g}
- Naupactus viridisquamosus Boheman, 1840^{c g}
- Naupactus viridissimus (Hustache, 1919)^{c g}
- Naupactus viridulus Hustache, 1947^{c g}
- Naupactus vossi Morrone, 1997^{c g}
- Naupactus xanthographus (Germar, 1824)^{c g}
- Naupactus zoilsoni Boheman, 1840^{c g}

Data sources: i = ITIS, c = Catalogue of Life, g = GBIF, b = Bugguide.net
