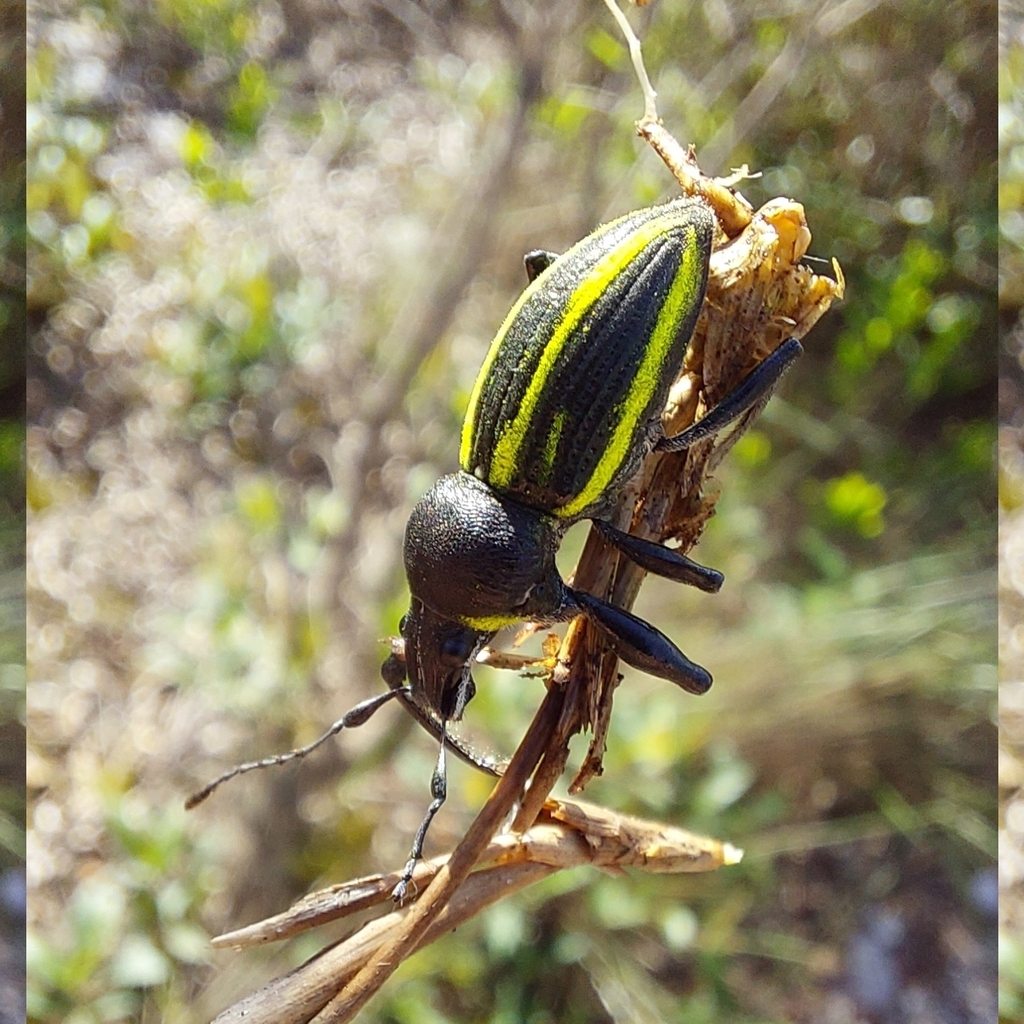

Scientific classification
- Kingdom: Animalia
- Phylum: Arthropoda
- Clade: Pancrustacea
- Class: Insecta
- Order: Coleoptera
- Suborder: Polyphaga
- Infraorder: Cucujiformia
- Superfamily: Curculionoidea
- Family: Curculionidae
- Genus: Teratopactus
- Species: T. vittatus

Binomial name
- Teratopactus vittatus Mannerheim, 1833

Synonyms
- Naupactus vittatus Mannerheim, 1833

= Teratopactus vittatus =

Species of beetle

Teratopactus vittatus is a species of broad-nosed weevil in the beetle family Curculionidae. It is endemic to Brazil and is found across the Chacoan and Parana subregions of the Neotropics and has expanded to the Cerrado.

The species was originally described as Naupactus vittatus by Mannerheim in 1833 and was transferred to the genus Teratopactus in 2006, based on morphological characteristics, including the structure of the ovipositor and humeri, which align with the diagnostic traits of the genus.

== Distribution ==
T. vittatus has been recorded in the Brazilian states of Bahia, Minas Gerais, and Rio de Janeiro. Specific collection sites include Encruzilhada, Ibiá, Poços de Caldas, and Serra do Caraça. These areas fall within the Cerrado and Atlantic Forest biomes.

Recent records, until April 2025, shared by citizen scientists indicate that this species is being encountered mostly in Brasília and in the Ibitipoca State Park.

== Morphology ==
This species is fairly large, with females reaching about 16 to 18.5 mm in length. Its back is mostly bare, showing a dark brown color, and it can be recognized by two pairs of yellowish stripes along the wing covers.

The humeri are prominent and armed with a strong tooth, and the pronotum is markedly convex with fine granulation. The frons of the head is longitudinally channeled, and the antennae are slender with a distinctly fusiform club. Unlike some related species, the flanks of the pronotum in T. vittatus generally lack prominent teeth.

== Taxonomy and systematics ==
According to a cladistic analysis using 36 morphological characters, T. vittatus is closely related to T. nodicollis, forming a well-supported clade within the genus. Both species share derived traits such as the presence of dorsal baculi in the female genitalia.

== Ecology and host plants ==
There is limited ecological information available specifically for T. vittatus. The genus generally inhabits savanna and forest mosaics, such as those found in the Cerrado biome. Only T. nodicollis has been associated with agricultural crops and native plants, and no specific host plants have been confirmed for T. vittatus to date.
