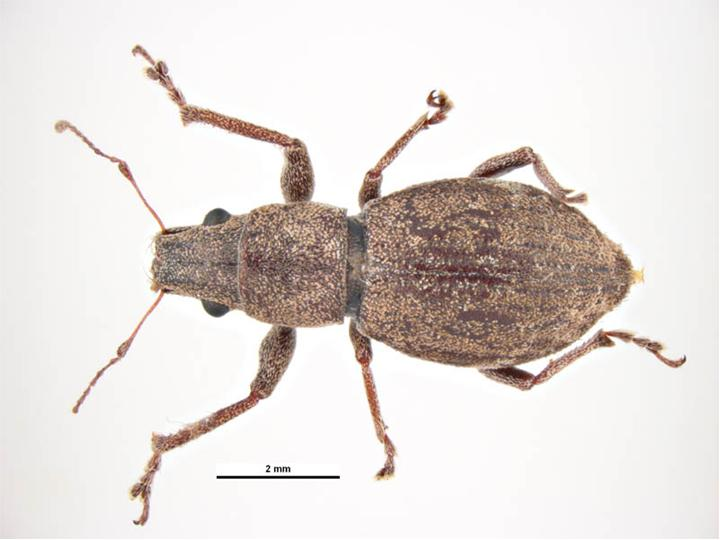
- Pantomorus cervinus

Scientific classification
- Kingdom: Animalia
- Phylum: Arthropoda
- Class: Insecta
- Order: Coleoptera
- Suborder: Polyphaga
- Infraorder: Cucujiformia
- Family: Curculionidae
- Subfamily: Entiminae
- Tribe: Naupactini
- Genus: Pantomorus; Schoenherr, 1840

= Pantomorus =

Genus of beetles

Pantomorus is a genus of broad-nosed weevils in the beetle family Curculionidae. There are more than 40 described species in Pantomorus.

== Species ==
These 44 species belong to the genus Pantomorus:

- Pantomorus albicans Sharp, 1891
- Pantomorus albosignatus Boheman, 1840
- Pantomorus annectens Sharp, 1891
- Pantomorus asperatus Sharp, 1891
- Pantomorus biseriatus Hustache, 1947
- Pantomorus brevipes Sharp, 1891
- Pantomorus cervinus
- Pantomorus circumcinctus Sharp, 1891
- Pantomorus comes Kuschel, 1956
- Pantomorus crinitus Boheman, 1840
- Pantomorus distans Sharp, 1891
- Pantomorus dorsalis Sharp, 1891
- Pantomorus elegans (Horn, 1876)
- Pantomorus faber Sharp, 1891
- Pantomorus facialis Sharp, 1891
- Pantomorus femoratus Sharp, 1891
- Pantomorus globicollis (Pascoe, 1886)
- Pantomorus hovidus Champion, 1911
- Pantomorus humilis
- Pantomorus inimicus Marshall, 1938
- Pantomorus longulus Sharp, 1891
- Pantomorus maculosus Boheman, 1840
- Pantomorus mollis Sharp, 1891
- Pantomorus nobilis Boheman, 1840
- Pantomorus pallidus
- Pantomorus parvulus Sharp, 1891
- Pantomorus picipes Sharp, 1891
- Pantomorus picturatus Sharp, 1891
- Pantomorus postfasciatus
- Pantomorus rudis Sharp, 1891
- Pantomorus rufipes Sharp, 1891
- Pantomorus ruizi Cortés, 1942
- Pantomorus salvadorensis Kuschel, 1956
- Pantomorus salvini Sharp, 1891
- Pantomorus sobrinus Sharp, 1891
- Pantomorus strabo Sharp, 1891
- Pantomorus stupidus Boheman, 1840
- Pantomorus subcinctus Sharp, 1891
- Pantomorus sulfureus Champion, 1911
- Pantomorus tesselatus
- Pantomorus trituberculatus Champion, 1911
- Pantomorus uniformis Sharp, 1891
- Pantomorus viridicans Sharp, 1891
- Pantomorus viridisquamosus Dalla Torre & van Emden, 1936
