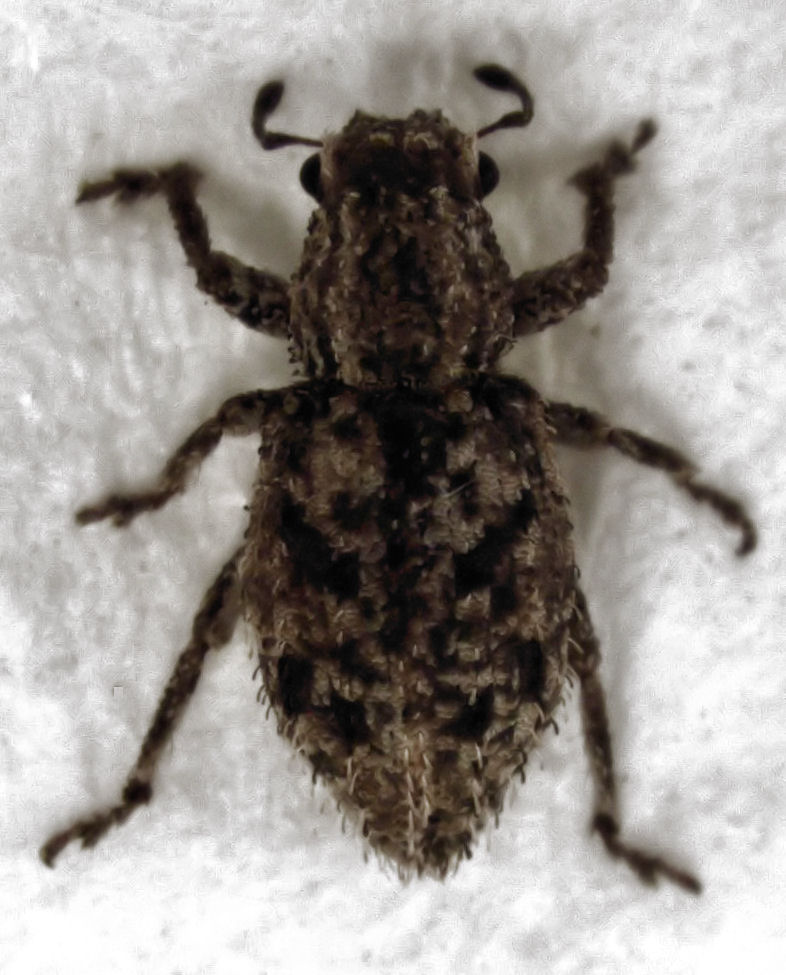
- Atrichonotus sordidus

Scientific classification
- Domain: Eukaryota
- Kingdom: Animalia
- Phylum: Arthropoda
- Class: Insecta
- Order: Coleoptera
- Suborder: Polyphaga
- Infraorder: Cucujiformia
- Family: Curculionidae
- Tribe: Naupactini
- Genus: Atrichonotus; Buchanan, 1939

= Atrichonotus =

Genus of beetles

Atrichonotus is a genus of broad-nosed weevils in the beetle family Curculionidae. There are about nine described species in Atrichonotus.

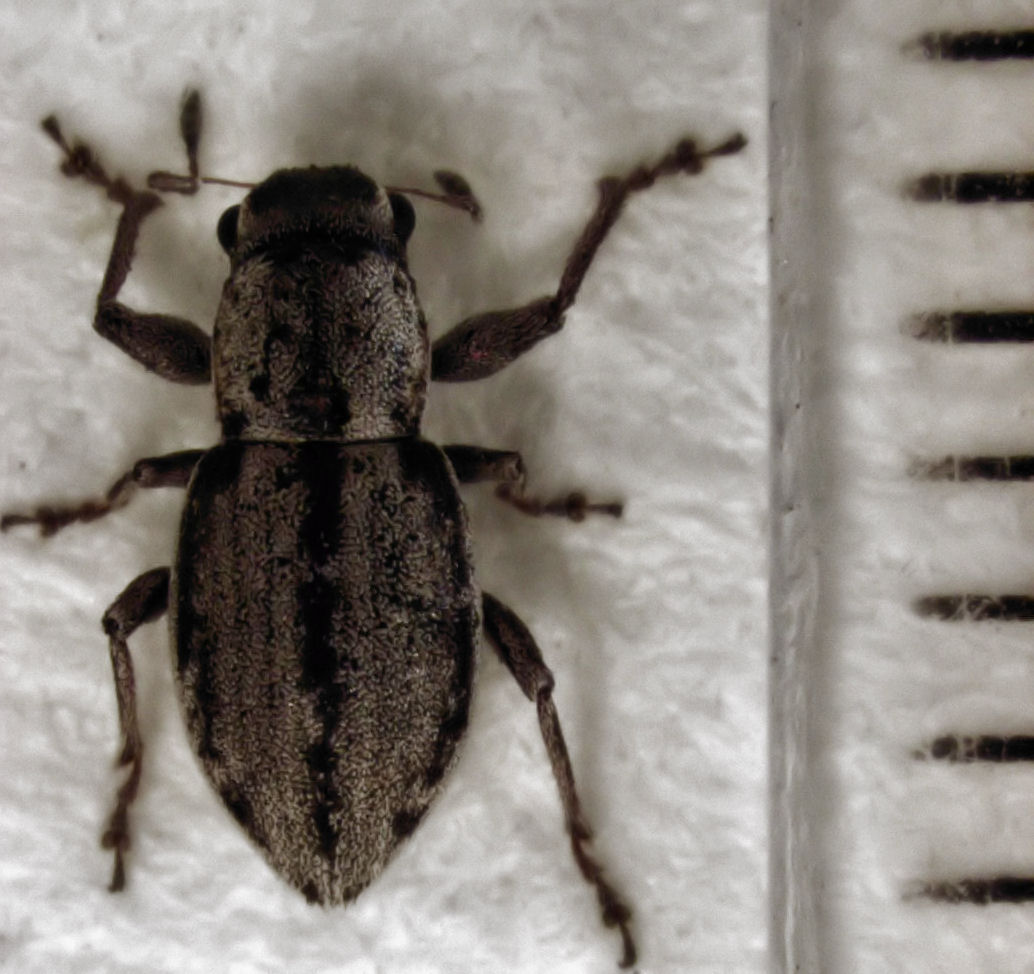
Atrichonotus taeniatulus

== Species ==
These nine species belong to the genus Atrichonotus:

- Atrichonotus aeniatulus (Berg, 1881)^{g}
- Atrichonotus convexifrons Hustache, 1939^{c g}
- Atrichonotus marginatus Hustache, 1939^{c g}
- Atrichonotus minimus Blanchard, 1851^{c g}
- Atrichonotus obscurus (Hustache, 1947)^{c g}
- Atrichonotus pacificus Kuschel, 1958^{c g}
- Atrichonotus sordidus Hustache, 1939^{c g}
- Atrichonotus taeniatulus (Berg, 1881)^{i c g b} (small lucerne weevil)
- Atrichonotus whiteheadi Lanteri, 1995^{c g}

Data sources: i = ITIS, c = Catalogue of Life, g = GBIF, b = Bugguide.net
