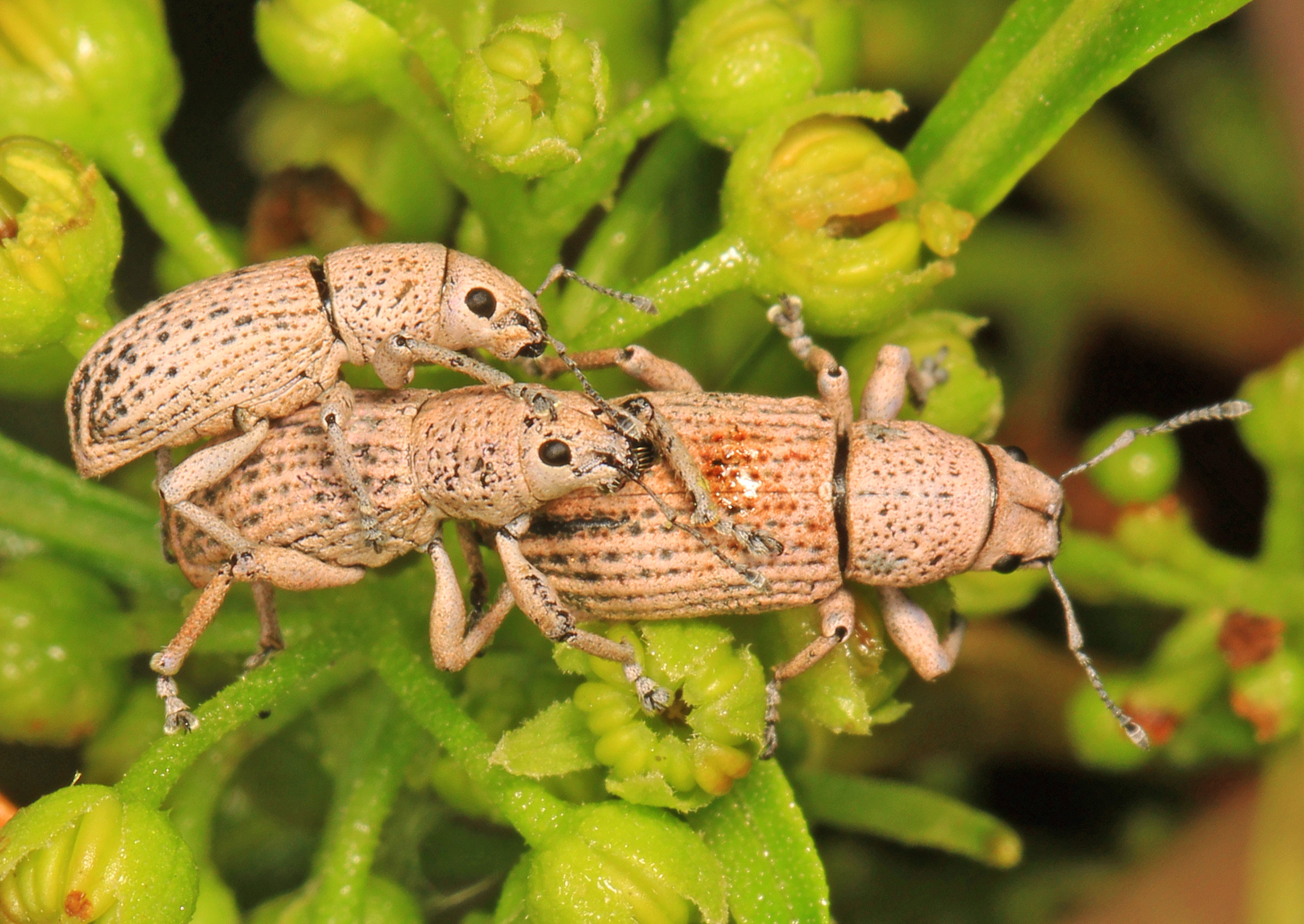

Scientific classification
- Domain: Eukaryota
- Kingdom: Animalia
- Phylum: Arthropoda
- Class: Insecta
- Order: Coleoptera
- Suborder: Polyphaga
- Infraorder: Cucujiformia
- Family: Curculionidae
- Genus: Artipus
- Species: A. floridanus

Binomial name
- Artipus floridanus Horn, 1876

= Artipus floridanus =

Species of beetle

Artipus floridanus, the little leaf notcher, is a species of broad-nosed weevil in the beetle family Curculionidae. It is found in North America.
