= Ericydeus viridans =

Scientific classification
- Kingdom: Animalia
- Phylum: Arthropoda
- Class: Insecta
- Order: Coleoptera
- Suborder: Polyphaga
- Infraorder: Cucujiformia
- Family: Curculionidae
- Genus: Ericydeus
- Species: E. viridans

Binomial name
- Ericydeus viridans Boheman, 1840

Synonyms
- Cyphus viridans Boheman, 1840

Species of beetle

Ericydeus viridans is a species of the true weevil family from Mexico.

== Description ==
Ericydeus viridans can reach a length of about 21 millimetres (0.83 in). This beetle is brownish to greenish with faint striping and spotting.
