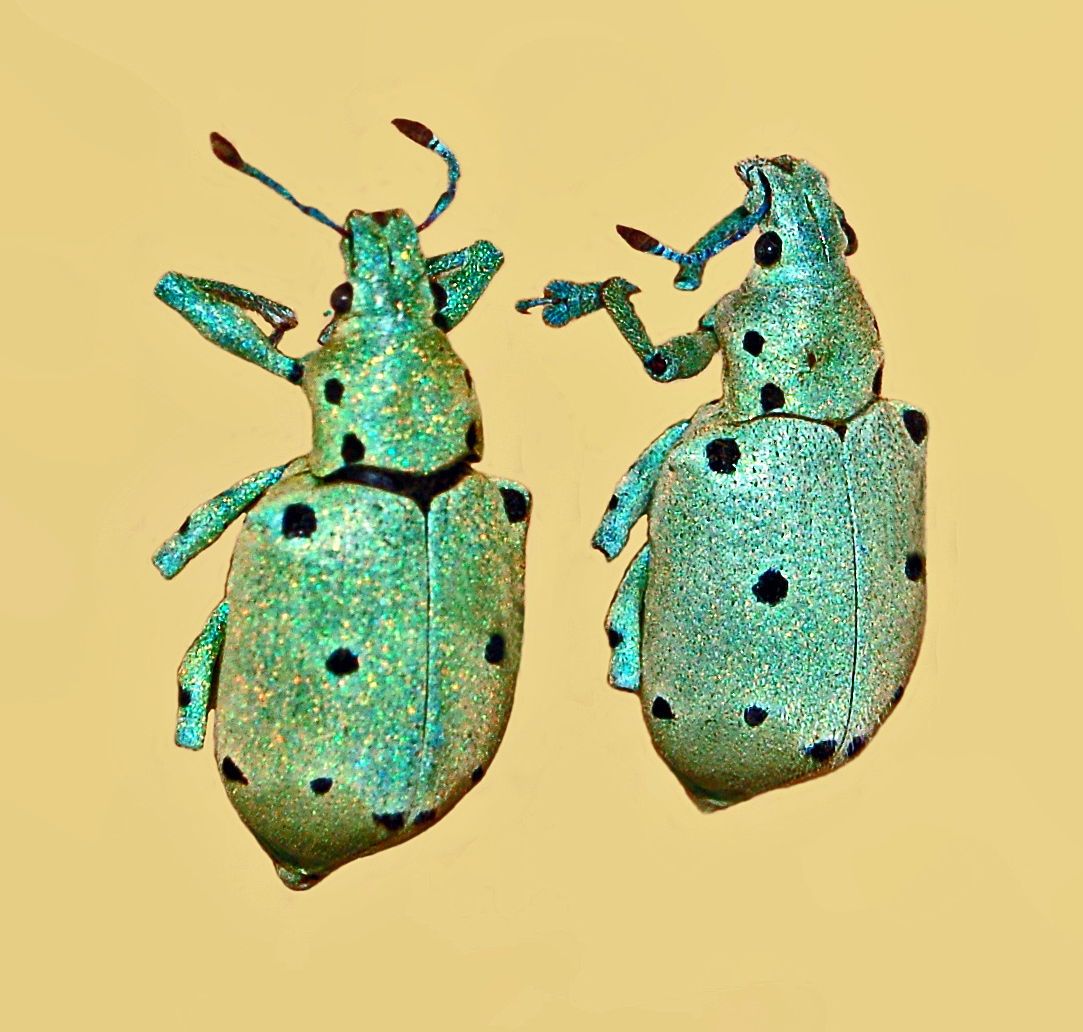
- Ericydeus nigropunctatus

Scientific classification
- Domain: Eukaryota
- Kingdom: Animalia
- Phylum: Arthropoda
- Class: Insecta
- Order: Coleoptera
- Suborder: Polyphaga
- Infraorder: Cucujiformia
- Family: Curculionidae
- Tribe: Naupactini
- Genus: Ericydeus; Pascoe, 1880

= Ericydeus =

Genus of beetles

Ericydeus is a genus of broad-nosed weevils in the beetle family Curculionidae. There are about 16 described species in Ericydeus.

== Species ==
These 16 species belong to the genus Ericydeus:

- Ericydeus argentinensis Lanteri, 1995^{c g}
- Ericydeus bahiensis Lanteri, 1995^{c g}
- Ericydeus cupreolus Lanteri, 1995^{c g}
- Ericydeus duodecimpunctatus Champion, 1911^{c g}
- Ericydeus forreri Champion, 1911^{c g}
- Ericydeus hancocki (Kirby, 435)^{c g}
- Ericydeus lautus (LeConte, 1856)^{i c g b}
- Ericydeus modestus Gyllenhal, 625^{c g}
- Ericydeus nigropunctatus (Chevrolat, 1877)^{c g}
- Ericydeus placidus (Horn, 1876)^{i c g}
- Ericydeus quadripunctatus Champion, 1911^{c g}
- Ericydeus roseiventris Champion, 1911^{c g}
- Ericydeus schoenherri Perty, 1832^{c g}
- Ericydeus sedecimpunctatus (Linnaeus, 1758)^{c g}
- Ericydeus viridans Boheman, 1840^{c g}
- Ericydeus yucatanus Champion, 1911^{c g}

Data sources: i = ITIS, c = Catalogue of Life, g = GBIF, b = Bugguide.net
