= Pactorrhinus =

Scientific classification
- Kingdom: Animalia
- Phylum: Arthropoda
- Class: Insecta
- Order: Coleoptera
- Suborder: Polyphaga
- Infraorder: Cucujiformia
- Family: Curculionidae
- Tribe: Naupactini
- Genus: Pactorrhinus; Ancey, 1881

Genus of beetles

Pactorrhinus is a genus of broad-nosed weevils in the beetle family Curculionidae. There is at least one described species in Pactorrhinus, P. grisescens.
