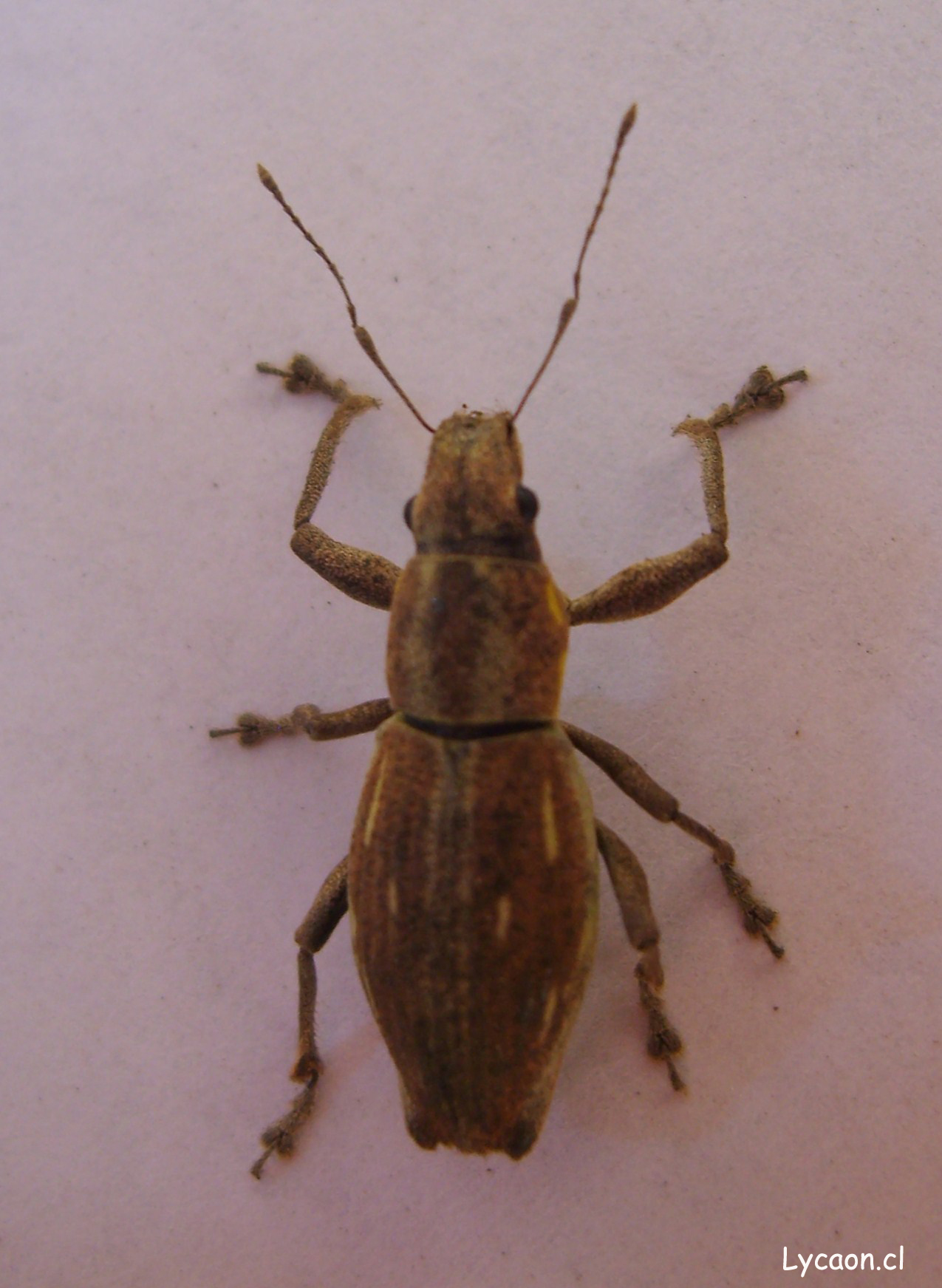

Scientific classification
- Domain: Eukaryota
- Kingdom: Animalia
- Phylum: Arthropoda
- Class: Insecta
- Order: Coleoptera
- Suborder: Polyphaga
- Infraorder: Cucujiformia
- Family: Curculionidae
- Genus: Naupactus
- Species: N. xanthographus

Binomial name
- Naupactus xanthographus (Germar, 1824)

= Naupactus xanthographus =

Species of insect

Naupactus xanthographus, the South American Fruit Tree Weevil, is a species of beetle of the family Curculionidae native to South America, well known for its predation to more than 45 species of fruit trees of agricultural importance.

== Description ==
They are medium-sized insects, adults reaching 11 mm to 14 mm. Its elytra, welded together, cover the abdomen and are covered in pigmented scales that form a pattern of yellow lines. Seasonality marks the pigmentation of the scales, being brown and ashy gray in winter, while yellow and green lines appear in spring-summer.

== Range ==
Naupactus xanthographus is endemic to the Southern Cone of South America, with reports of its presence from the Tropic of Capricorn to about 41°S. It has also been reported in Easter Island.
