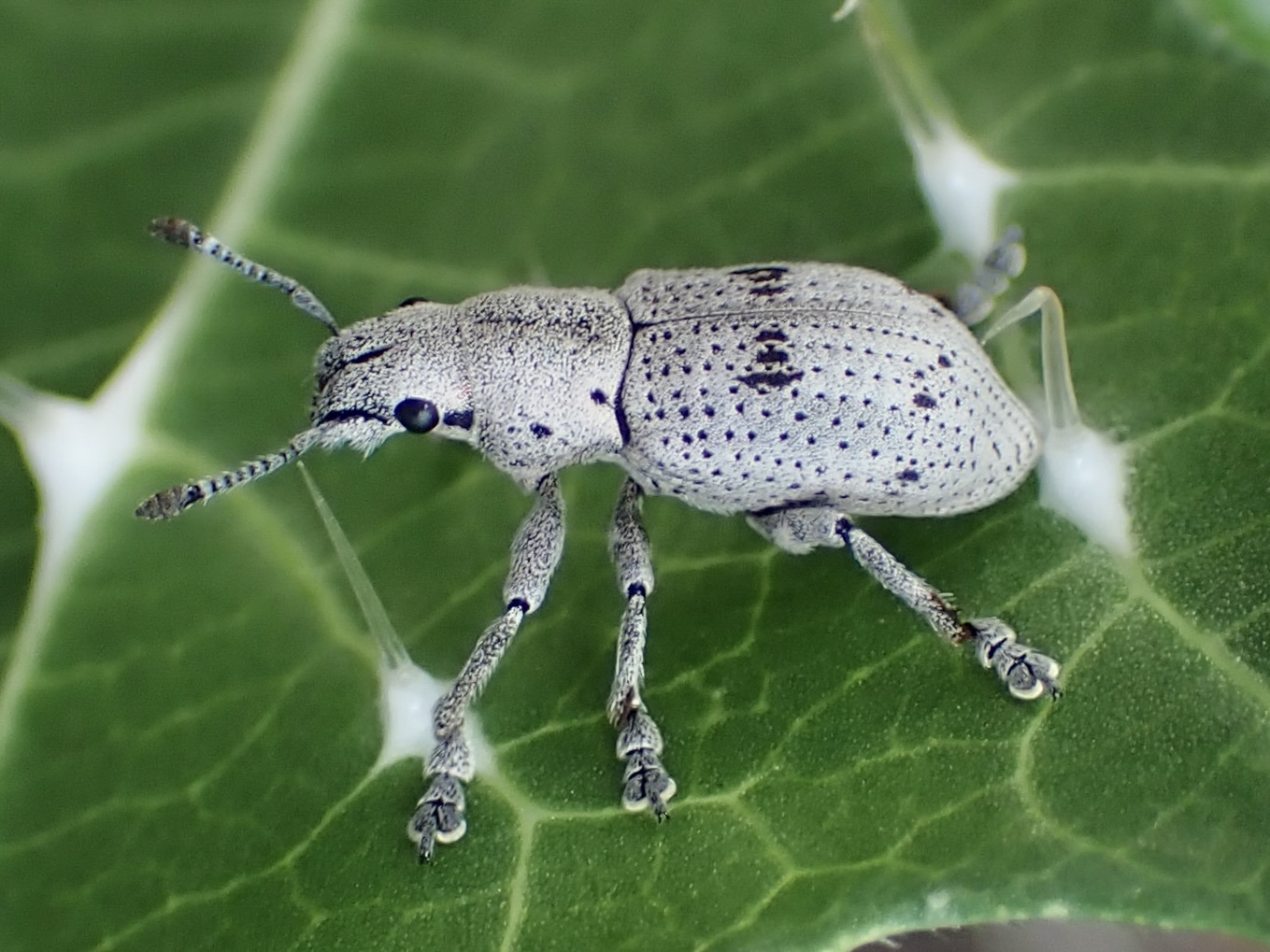

Scientific classification
- Kingdom: Animalia
- Phylum: Arthropoda
- Class: Insecta
- Order: Coleoptera
- Suborder: Polyphaga
- Infraorder: Cucujiformia
- Family: Curculionidae
- Genus: Ericydeus
- Species: E. lautus

Binomial name
- Ericydeus lautus (LeConte, 1856)

= Ericydeus lautus =

Species of beetle

Ericydeus lautus is a species of broad-nosed weevil in the beetle family Curculionidae. It is found in North America.
