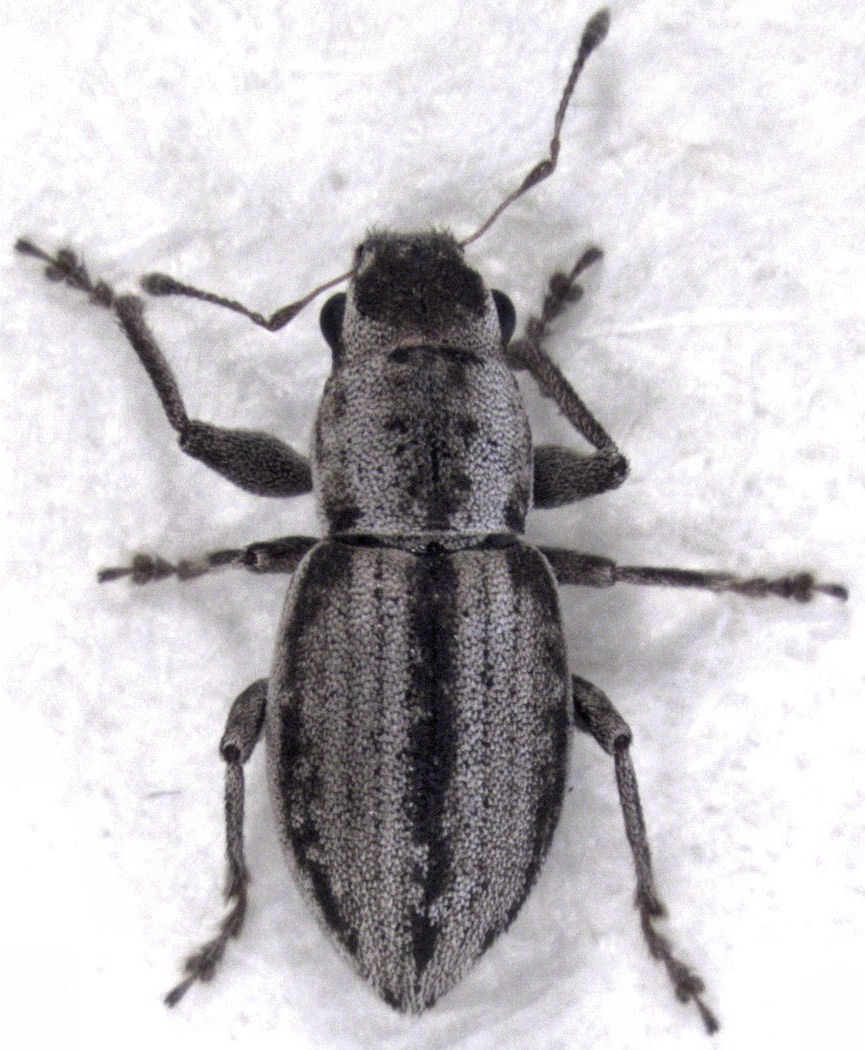

Scientific classification
- Domain: Eukaryota
- Kingdom: Animalia
- Phylum: Arthropoda
- Class: Insecta
- Order: Coleoptera
- Suborder: Polyphaga
- Infraorder: Cucujiformia
- Family: Curculionidae
- Genus: Atrichonotus
- Species: A. taeniatulus

Binomial name
- Atrichonotus taeniatulus (Berg, 1881)

Synonyms
- Artipus texanus Pierce, 1911; Pantomorus pictipennis Hustache, 1947

= Atrichonotus taeniatulus =

Species of beetle

Atrichonotus taeniatulus, known generally as the small lucerne weevil or little fringed weevil, is a species of broad-nosed weevil in the beetle family Curculionidae. It is found in North America.

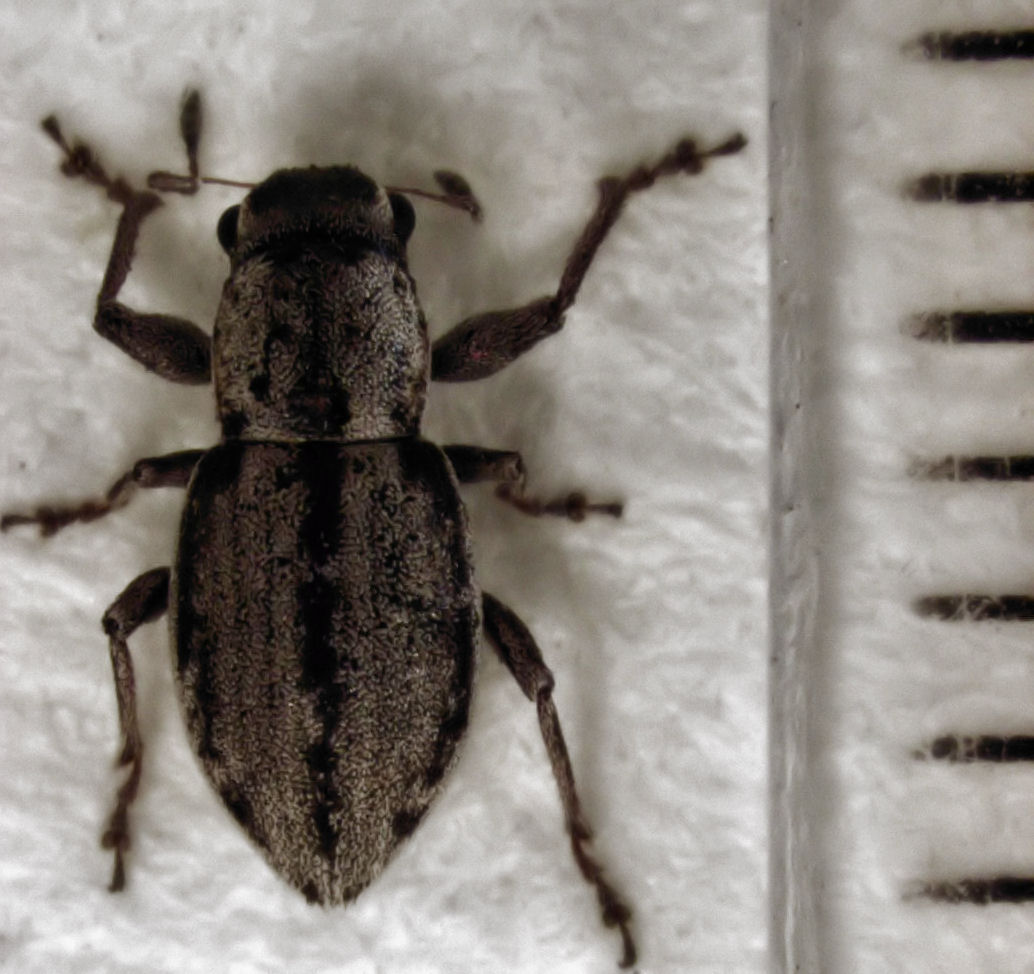
Small lucerne weevil, Atrichonotus taeniatulus
