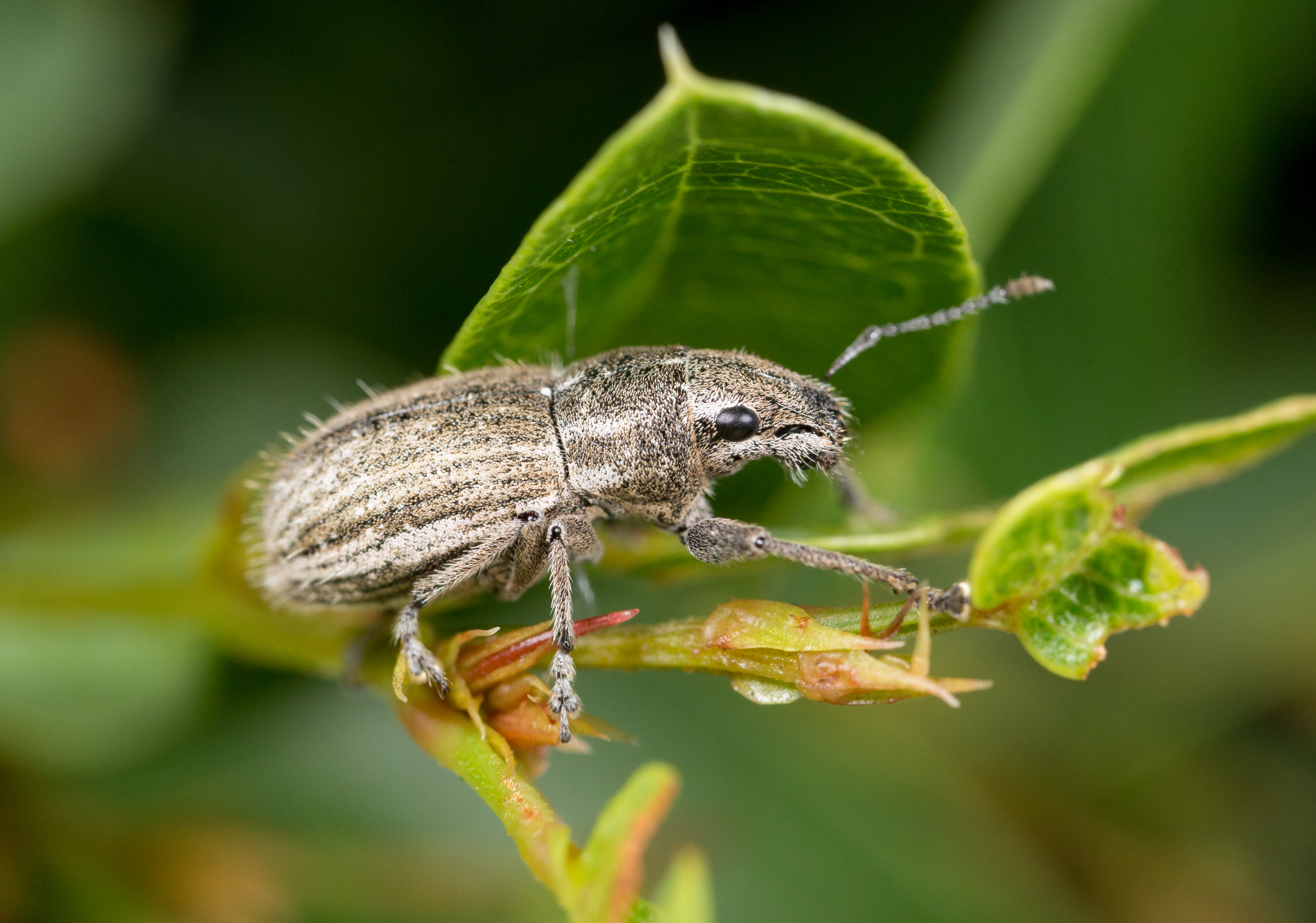

Scientific classification
- Kingdom: Animalia
- Phylum: Arthropoda
- Clade: Pancrustacea
- Class: Insecta
- Order: Coleoptera
- Suborder: Polyphaga
- Infraorder: Cucujiformia
- Superfamily: Curculionoidea
- Family: Curculionidae
- Genus: Naupactus
- Species: N. leucoloma

Binomial name
- Naupactus leucoloma Boh. in Schoenh., 1840

= Naupactus leucoloma =

Species of beetle

Naupactus leucoloma is a species of broad-nosed weevil in the beetle family Curculionidae.

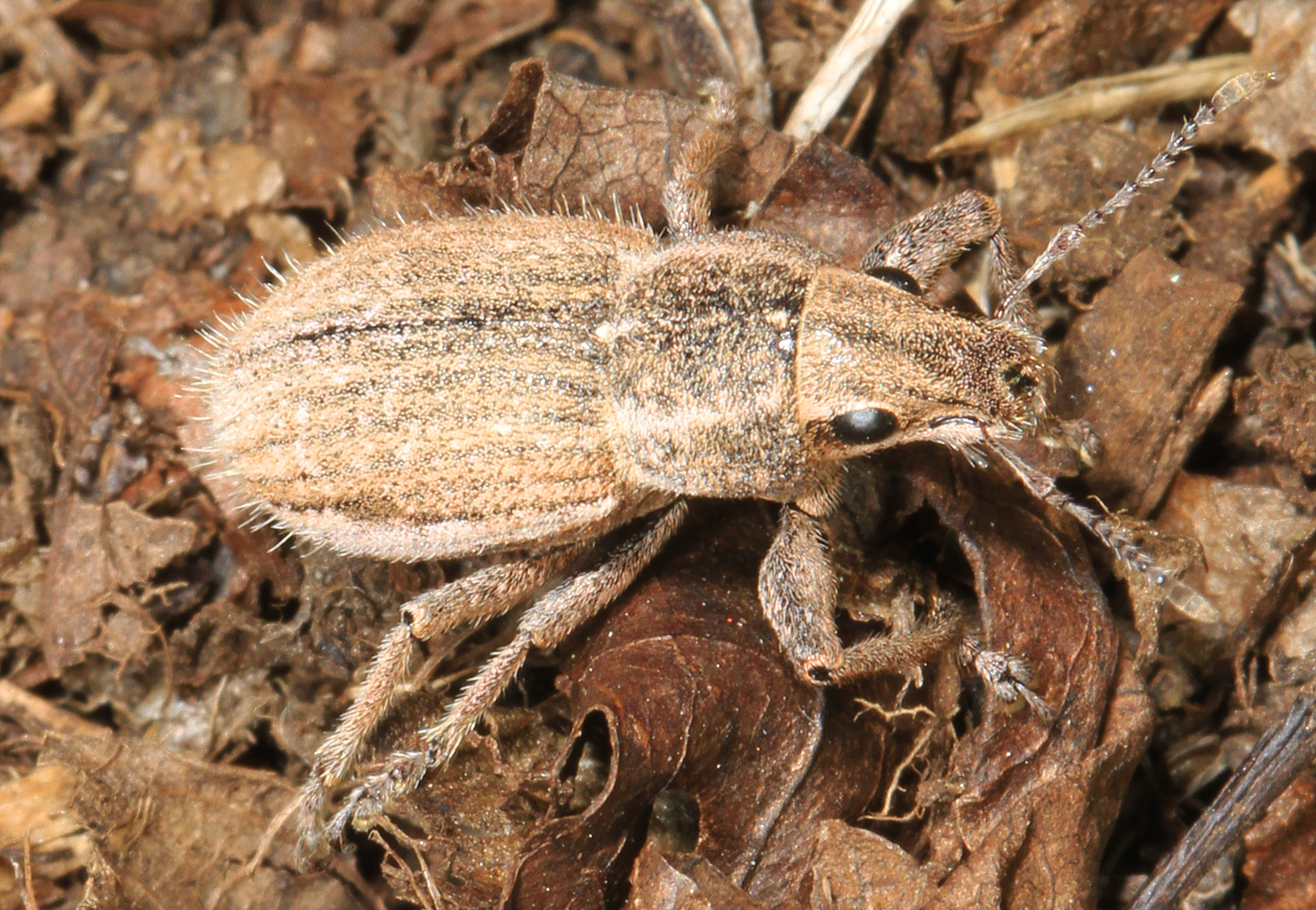

== Description ==
The adult of Naupactus leucoloma is dark grey in colour with two lighter-coloured bands running longitudinally down its thorax and head. They are between 8-12mm long, and 4mm wide at the abdomen. The body of N. leucoloma is covered with hairs that are longer on the forewing. Wings of N. leucoloma vary greatly in size between individual specimens, but the forewings are fused, thus making the adults unable to fly. Males are not known to exist with N. leucoloma outside of their native range, and all individuals are females in the naturalised range. Reproduction is through parthenogenesis. Males of N. leucoloma are rare and only occur in the native range of South America, but also may be extinct.

The larvae of N. leucoloma are about 12mm long, and occur in the soil. They have no legs similar to other species of weevils, their heads are partially retracted into the thorax, and they are yellowish white in colour, with black mandibles protruding from the head.

== Distribution ==
Naupactus leucoloma is native to much of Argentina, from the Jujay and Salta provinces northwest, right down to the southeast in the Chubut province. It is also native to Uruguay and southern Brazil. Outside the native range, N. leucoloma has also been introduced through anthropological means to the United States, South Africa, Chile, Peru, Australia and New Zealand where it is well established

== New Zealand Distribution ==
Naupactus leucoloma was first found in New Zealand in 1944 and is now well established through most of the North Island. It has since been recorded in several parts of the South Island as well, including Nelson, Blenheim, Christchurch and Ashburton.

== Habitat Preferences ==
Naupactus leucoloma is a pest in its non-native range and feeds on 385 different plant species including beans, clover, potatoes and many more. The larval stage of N. leucoloma feeds on the roots of the host plants; this is where most of the damage occurs to the plants. The adult stages feed on the leaves so in their non-native range are found in pastures. In their native range, they occupy fertile plains in a temperate climate, where the main vegetation and habitat type is grass prairies and grass steppes with little to no native trees.

== Phenology ==
Naupactus leucoloma are all female outside their native range so reproduction happens through parthenogenesis. Eggs are laid in clusters on the ground around cover objects at the contact point with the soil. When soil penetration is easy then eggs are deposited directly into the soil; 15 to 25 are usually laid, but as many as 60 have been recorded from a single deposition. Eggs kept for study by Young & App, had an average incubation period of 14.7 days for eggs laid between July 21 and August 29. Some eggs deposited in later months had an average incubation period of 62.4 days, but eggs laid too late in the summer will overwinter, and hatch the following year. The larval stage lasts roughly 10 to 17 months, during which the larvae pass through four or possibly five instar larval stages prior to pupating. Larvae first hatch in New Zealand in May, indicating that moist conditions are necessary for hatching, and in August in North America. Studies have shown that temperature played a large role in the time it takes for adults to emerge from pupation, with pupae produced during warmer months taking 14 days, and colder months taking up to 30 days for adults to emerge.

In New Zealand, adults appear in December and are active until April. During the months of its adult stage, a single N. leucoloma can lay hundreds of eggs. In North America, adults emerge from pupation from May to October, with emergence being dependent on soil moisture. Adults are alive and active for up to three months.

== Diet ==
The larval stage of Naupactus leucoloma has the most potential for significant damage to crops with young plants quite often being killed as a result of the damage, and adult plants surviving but often with a large yield loss. This is a result of the larvae feeding on and causing significant damage to the root systems. N. leucoloma larvae are great generalists and have been observed feeding on 385 different plant species. Some of these species include alfalfa, beans, brassicas, carrots, clover, onions and potatoes. Adults of this species feed on the leaves of a large diversity of plants; this herbivory, however, causes less damage and is not usually of as much significance as the larval stage, but can still cause significant damage if the numbers are high enough.

== Predators, Parasites and Diseases ==
Some invertebrate species are known to predate upon N. leucoloma in its native range, including multiple carabid beetle species, and in laboratory experiments, a mite (Histiostoma feroniarum) caused a significant amount of mortality in the larval stage. The South American bird species Milvago chimango chimango and Belonpterus chilensis chilensis have both been recorded as eating Naupactus leucoloma and may be effective as a control agent in its native range. No parasites or diseases have been found to occur on populations of N. leucoloma in the introduced population in New Zealand. House Sparrows (Passer domesticus) have been observed eating Naupactus leucoloma in New Zealand.

== Other information ==
When fed on blackberry foliage, adult N. leucoloma laid an average of 538.2 eggs, and when fed peanut foliage, the average number of eggs laid was 1,531.7.
