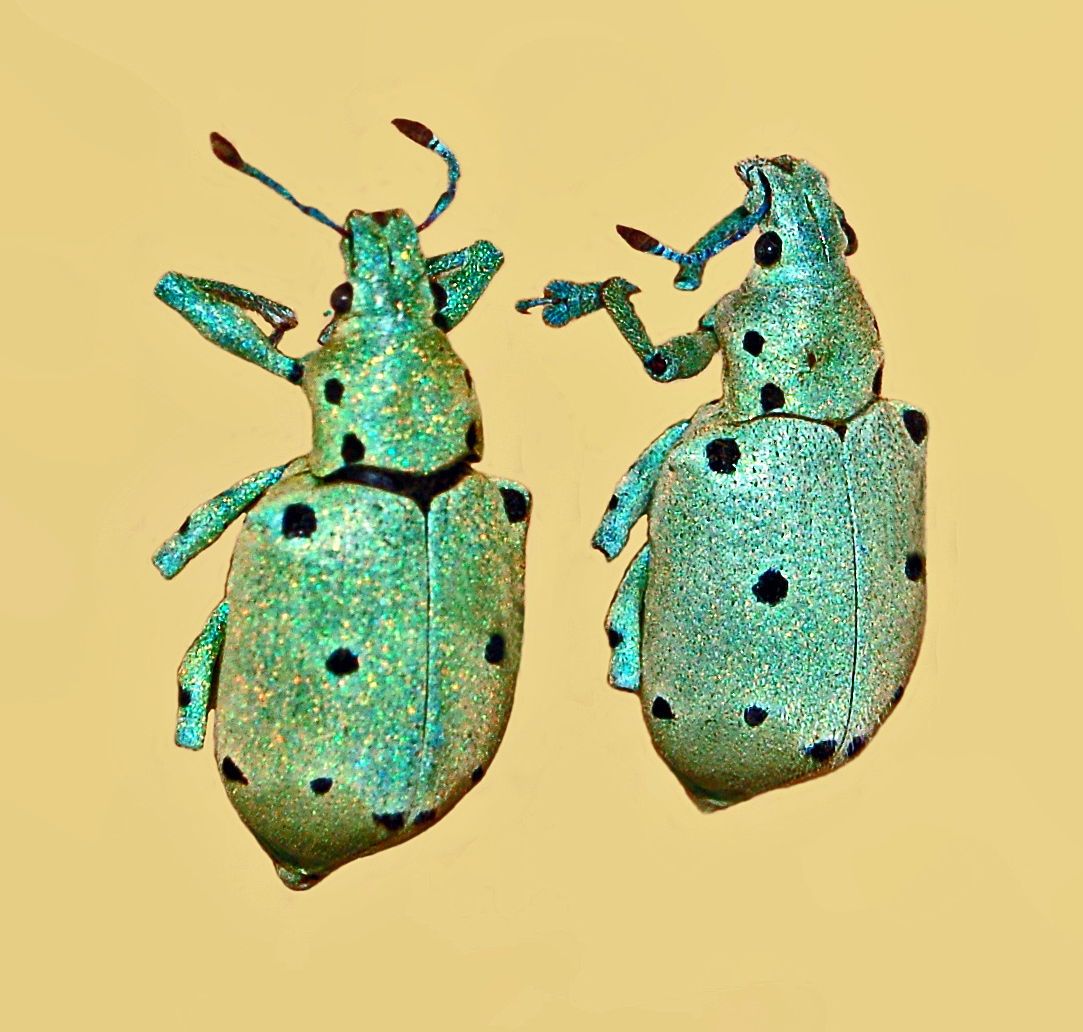

Scientific classification
- Domain: Eukaryota
- Kingdom: Animalia
- Phylum: Arthropoda
- Class: Insecta
- Order: Coleoptera
- Suborder: Polyphaga
- Infraorder: Cucujiformia
- Family: Curculionidae
- Genus: Ericydeus
- Species: E. nigropunctatus

Binomial name
- Ericydeus nigropunctatus Chevrolat, 1877

Synonyms
- Cyphus nigropunctatus Chevrolat, 1877; Neocyphus nigropunctatus Chevrolat, 1877; Ericydeus humeralis Hustache 1938

= Ericydeus nigropunctatus =

Species of beetle

Ericydeus nigropunctatus is a species of the true weevil family.

== Description ==
Ericydeus nigropunctatus can reach a length of about 25 millimetres (0.98 in). This beetle is glossy, light green, with black spots.

== Distribution ==
This species occurs in Colombia, Ecuador, Peru, and Venezuela.
