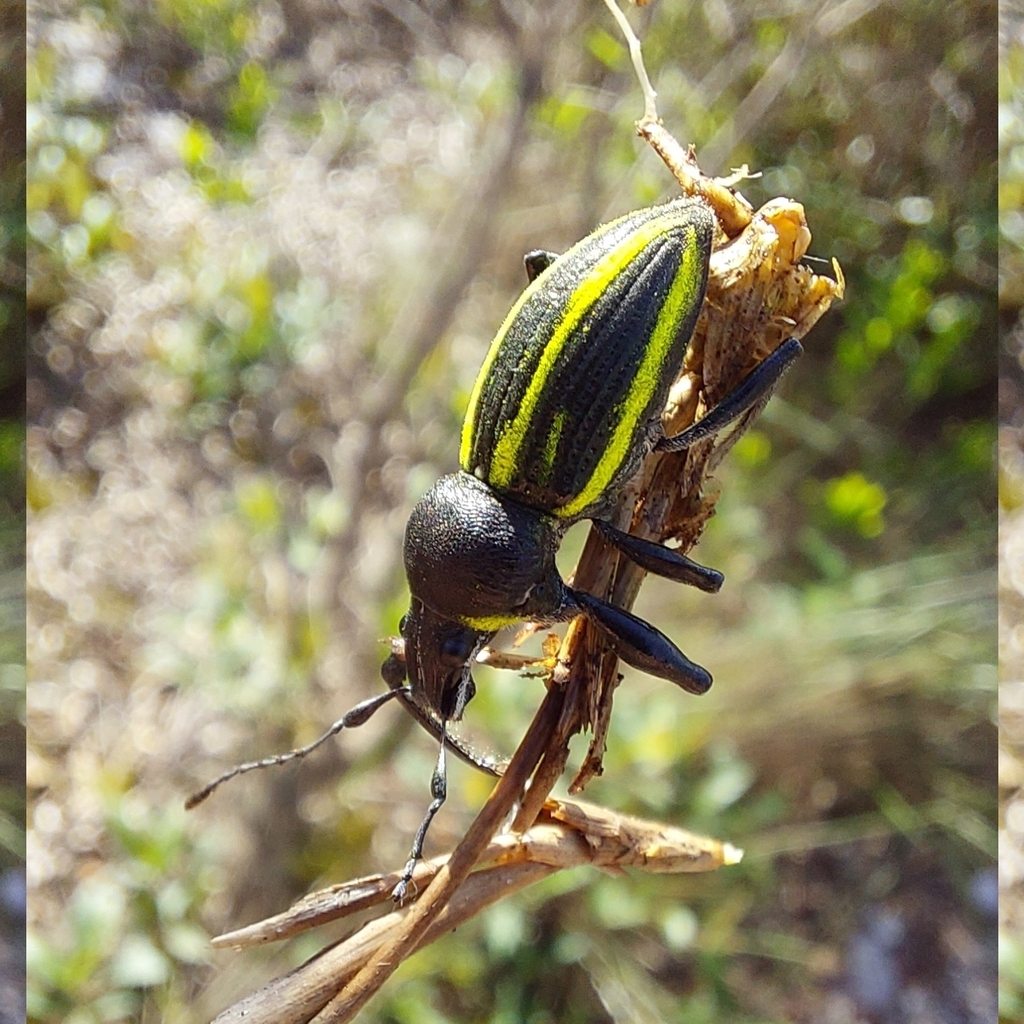
- Teratopactus vittatus

Scientific classification
- Domain: Eukaryota
- Kingdom: Animalia
- Phylum: Arthropoda
- Class: Insecta
- Order: Coleoptera
- Suborder: Polyphaga
- Infraorder: Cucujiformia
- Family: Curculionidae
- Subfamily: Entiminae
- Tribe: Naupactini
- Genus: Teratopactus; Heller, 1921

= Teratopactus =

Genus of beetles

Teratopactus is a genus of broad-nosed weevils in the tribe Naupactini, subfamily Entiminae, primarily distributed across South America. There are about 9 described species in Teratopactus.

== Species ==
These 10 species belong to the genus Teratopactus:

- Teratopactus acerbus (Boheman, 1840)
- Teratopactus capucinus (Perty, 1832)
- Teratopactus elegans (Lucas, 1857)
- Teratopactus gibbicollis (Boheman, 1833)
- Teratopactus nodicollis (Boheman, 1833)
- Teratopactus retusus (Boheman, 1833)
- Teratopactus sulphureoviridis (Hustache, 1938)
- Teratopactus tuberculatus (Arrow, 1903)
- Teratopactus vittatus (Mannerheim, 1833)
