= Mesagroicus =

Scientific classification
- Domain: Eukaryota
- Kingdom: Animalia
- Phylum: Arthropoda
- Class: Insecta
- Order: Coleoptera
- Suborder: Polyphaga
- Infraorder: Cucujiformia
- Family: Curculionidae
- Tribe: Naupactini
- Genus: Mesagroicus; Schönherr, 1840

Genus of beetles

Mesagroicus is a genus of broad-nosed weevils in the beetle family Curculionidae. There are at least 40 described species in Mesagroicus.

== Species ==
These 40 species belong to the genus Mesagroicus:

- Mesagroicus affaber Faust, 1885
- Mesagroicus amicalis Magnano, Osella & Abbazzi, 2008
- Mesagroicus analis Reitter, 1903
- Mesagroicus anatolicus K.Daniel & J.Daniel, 1902
- Mesagroicus angustirostris Faust, 1882
- Mesagroicus auliensis Reitter, 1903
- Mesagroicus auratus Korotyaev, 1979
- Mesagroicus conicirostris Reitter, 1903
- Mesagroicus depressipennis Pic, 1897
- Mesagroicus elongatus Reitter, 1915
- Mesagroicus elongellus Emden, 1936
- Mesagroicus erinaceus Faust, 1883
- Mesagroicus fasciatus Reitter, 1903
- Mesagroicus fuscus Y-Q.Chen, 1991
- Mesagroicus graecus Stierlin, 1890
- Mesagroicus hauseri Reitter, 1903
- Mesagroicus helleri Reitter, 1903
- Mesagroicus herricki (Pierce, 1910)
- Mesagroicus hispidus Buchanan, 1929
- Mesagroicus hofferi Penecke, 1917
- Mesagroicus incertus Buchanan
- Mesagroicus lederi Faust, 1887
- Mesagroicus manifestus Faust, 1883
- Mesagroicus minor Buchanan, 1929
- Mesagroicus nevadianus Buchanan
- Mesagroicus oblongus Buchanan, 1929
- Mesagroicus obscurus Boheman, 1840
- Mesagroicus occipitalis Germar, 1848
- Mesagroicus ocularis Buchanan, 1929
- Mesagroicus parmerensis Burke, 1960
- Mesagroicus petraeus Faust, 1885
- Mesagroicus piliferus (Boheman, 1833)
- Mesagroicus plumosus Buchanan, 1929
- Mesagroicus poriventris Reitter, 1903
- Mesagroicus rusticanus Faust, 1883
- Mesagroicus stierlini Reitter, 1903
- Mesagroicus strigisquamosus Buchanan, 1929
- Mesagroicus sulcicollis Reitter, 1903
- Mesagroicus sus Faust, 1883
- Mesagroicus viduatus Faust, 1883
