= Glaphyrometopus =

Scientific classification
- Kingdom: Animalia
- Phylum: Arthropoda
- Class: Insecta
- Order: Coleoptera
- Suborder: Polyphaga
- Infraorder: Cucujiformia
- Family: Curculionidae
- Genus: Glaphyrometopus; Pierce, 1913
- Species: G. ornithodorus

Binomial name
- Glaphyrometopus ornithodorus Pierce, 1913

Genus of beetles

Glaphyrometopus is a genus of broad-nosed weevils in the beetle family Curculionidae. There is at least one described species in Glaphyrometopus, G. ornithodorus.
