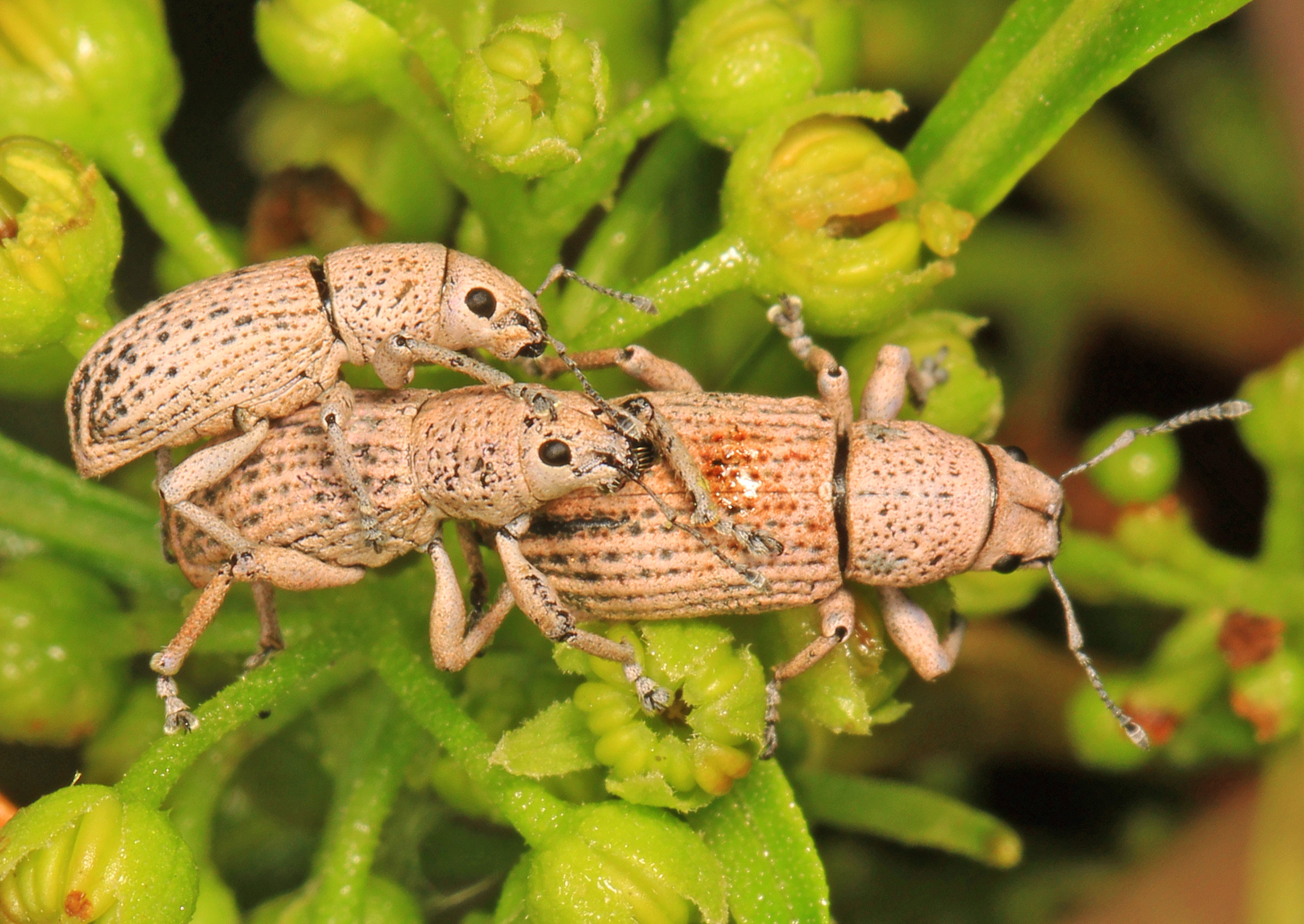
- Artipus floridanus

Scientific classification
- Domain: Eukaryota
- Kingdom: Animalia
- Phylum: Arthropoda
- Class: Insecta
- Order: Coleoptera
- Suborder: Polyphaga
- Infraorder: Cucujiformia
- Family: Curculionidae
- Genus: Artipus; Sahlberg, 1823

= Artipus =

Genus of beetles

Artipus is a genus of broad-nosed weevils in the beetle family Curculionidae. There are about 10 described species in Artipus.

== Species ==
These 10 species belong to the genus Artipus:

- Artipus calceatus Marshall, 1926^{c g}
- Artipus coryaceus Sahlberg, 1823^{c g}
- Artipus corycaeus Sahlberg, 1823^{g}
- Artipus floridanus Horn, 1876^{i c g b} (little leaf notcher)
- Artipus freyanus Kuschel, 1958^{c g}
- Artipus grisescens Chevrolat, 1880^{c g}
- Artipus monae Wolcott, 1941^{c g}
- Artipus porosicollis Chevrolat, 1880^{c g}
- Artipus psittacinus Gyllenhal, 1834^{c g}
- Artipus unguiculatus Chevrolat, 1880^{c g}

Data sources: i = ITIS, c = Catalogue of Life, g = GBIF, b = Bugguide.net
