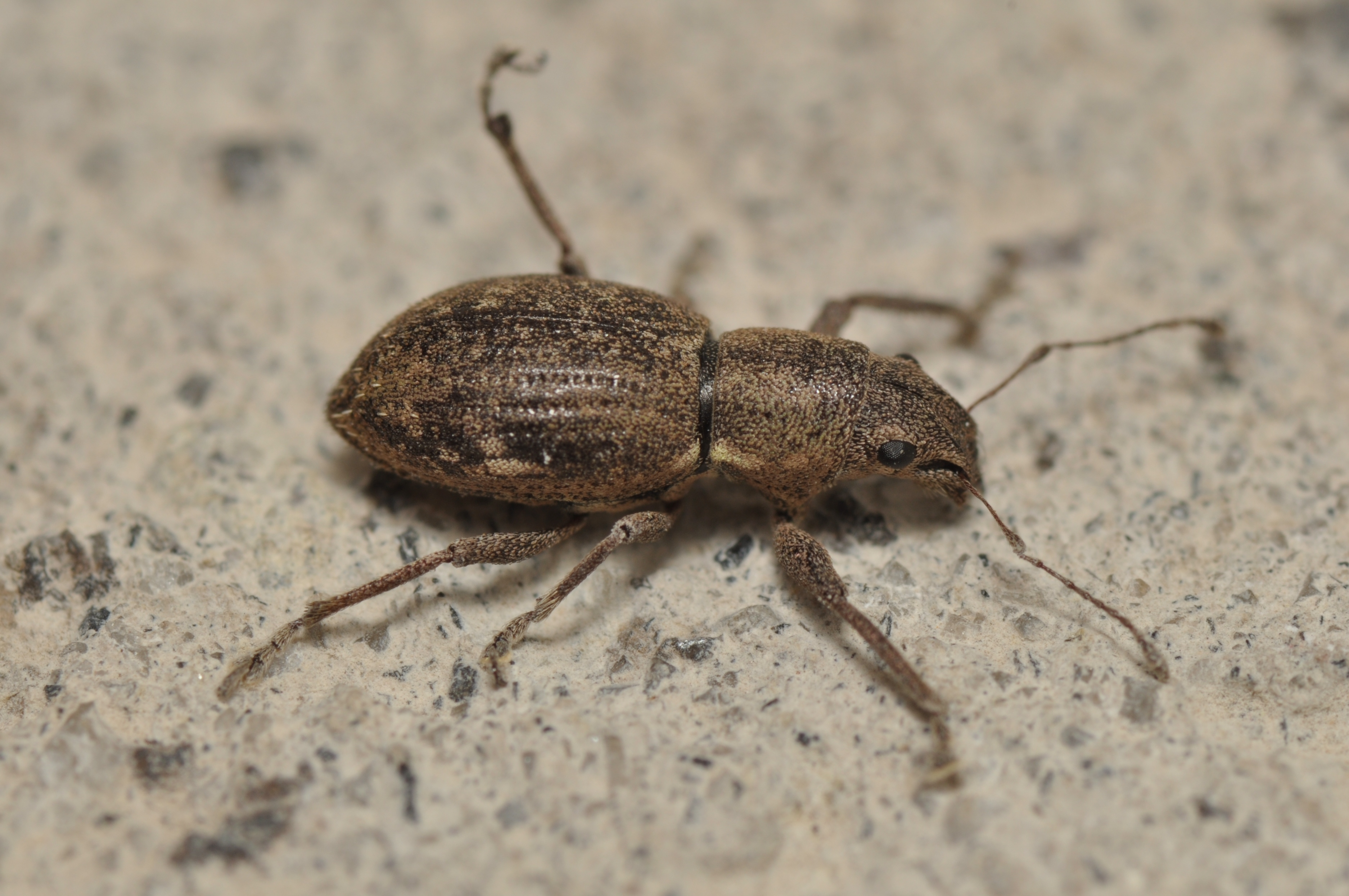

Scientific classification
- Kingdom: Animalia
- Phylum: Arthropoda
- Clade: Pancrustacea
- Class: Insecta
- Order: Coleoptera
- Suborder: Polyphaga
- Infraorder: Cucujiformia
- Family: Curculionidae
- Genus: Naupactus
- Species: N. cervinus

Binomial name
- Naupactus cervinus Boheman, 1840

Synonyms
- Asynonychus godmanni Crotch, 1867; Aramigus fulleri Horn, 1876; Naupactus godmani Auctt. (Missp.)

= Naupactus cervinus =

Species of beetle

Naupactus cervinus, the Fuller rose beetle or Fuller's rose weevil, is a species of broad-nosed weevil in the family Curculionidae. Native to South America, it has been in North America since the 19th century, and has also been introduced to Europe, South Africa, and Australia. This species is believed to reproduce parthogenically, without fertilisation, as no male specimens have ever been found.

N. cervinus grows to 6.5-8 mm in length and is highly polyphagous, feeding on leaves, buds, roots, flowers and larvae.

== Description ==
Adults are brown-grey in colour with laterally positioned eyes. The rostrum is slightly curved downward, and the elytra is fused, rendering the weevil flightless.

Eggs are small, cylindrical and yellow, measuring about 1 mm in length. They are laid in a mass and covered by a sticky, white excretion. Larvae are white with a yellow-ish head capsule and black mandibles, measuring 10-12 mm.

== Biology ==
Females lay up to 1000 eggs in their lifetime. Eggs are usually laid under stones or in bark crevasses, on leaves, or in the calyx lobes of fruit. After two to six weeks the eggs hatch, the larvae dropping to the ground, burrowing, and feeds on roots for the next eight to ten months.

Adults live for three to eight months.

Host plants of N. cervinus include beans, citrus fruits, peaches, rhubarb, roses, potatoes, wattles, walnuts, avocado, bananas, passionfruit and apples.
