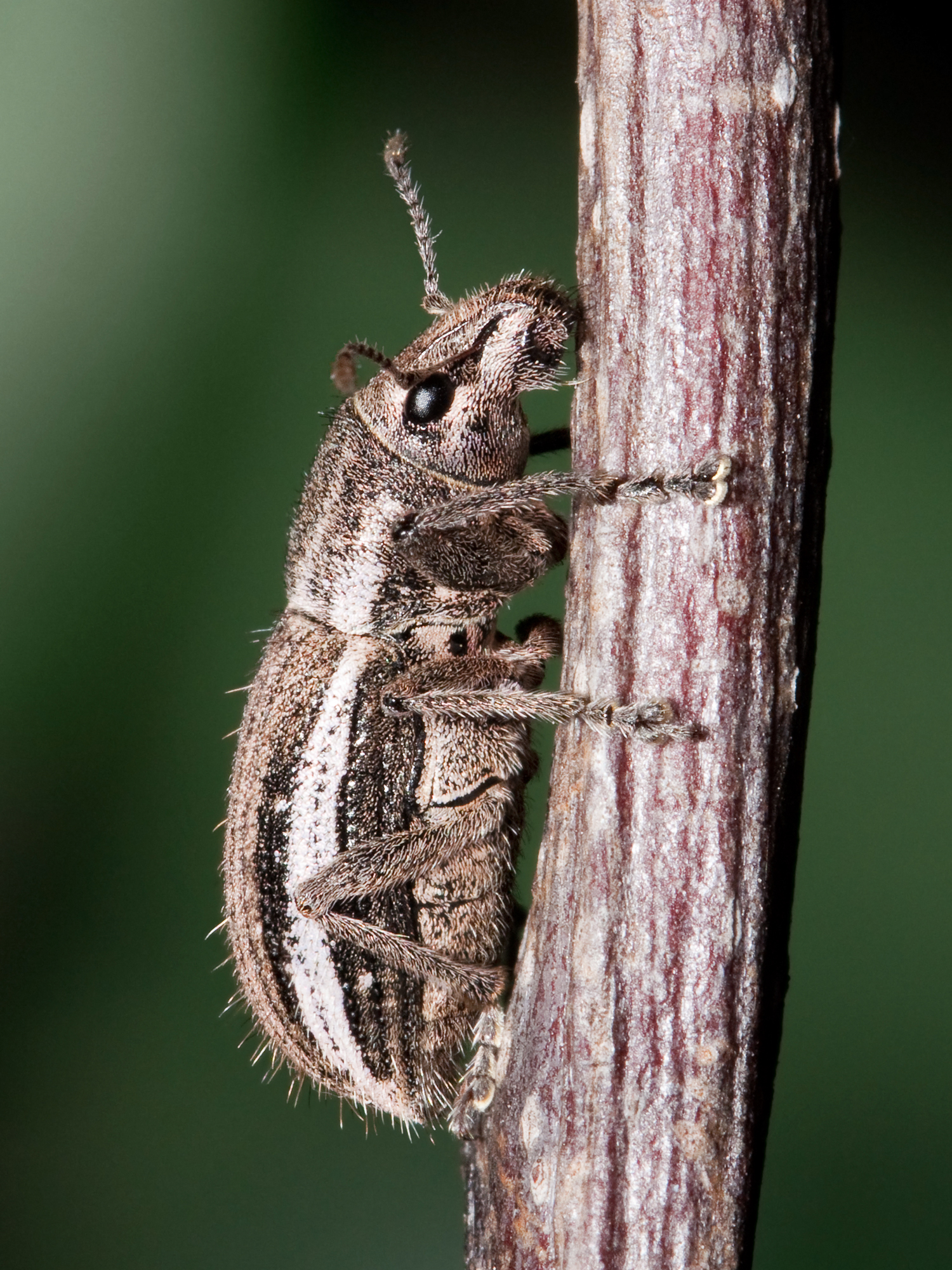
- Naupactus sp.

Scientific classification
- Kingdom: Animalia
- Phylum: Arthropoda
- Class: Insecta
- Order: Coleoptera
- Suborder: Polyphaga
- Infraorder: Cucujiformia
- Family: Curculionidae
- Tribe: Naupactini
- Genus: Naupactus; Dejean, 1821

Diversity
- at least 230 species

Synonyms
- Asynonychus Crotch, 1867; Graphognathus

= Naupactus (beetle) =

Genus of beetles

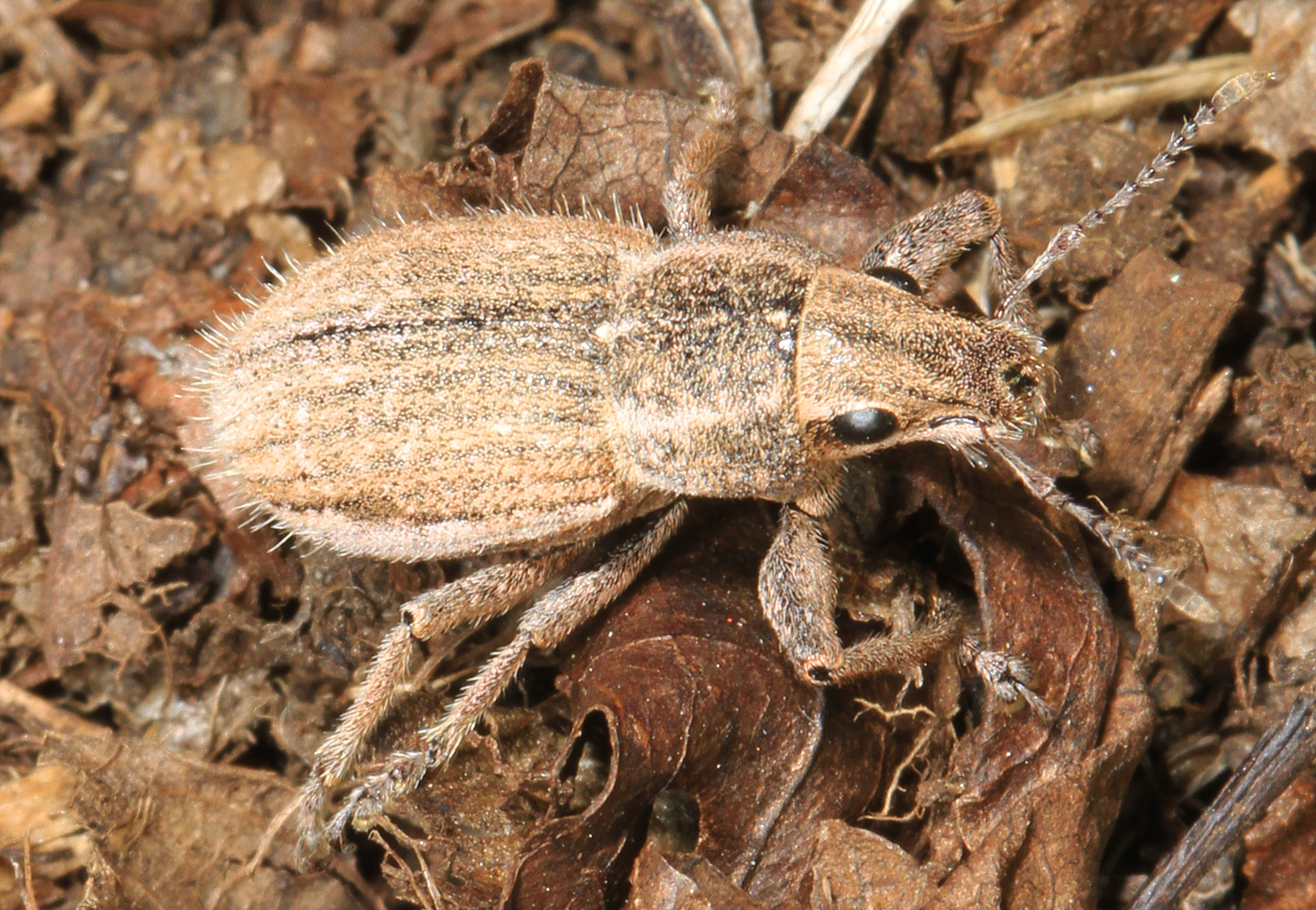
Naupactus leucoloma

Naupactus is a genus of beetles in the weevil family Curculionidae, the true weevils. They are known commonly as whitefringed beetles. Many species of the genus are considered pests, both as larvae and as adults. The genus is native to the Americas, where it is distributed from Mexico to Argentina; the highest species diversity is in Brazil. Several species have been introduced to the United States and New Zealand.

Some Naupactus have fully developed wings, while others have rudimentary or absent wings and are flightless. The females have flexible ovipositors with which they deposit eggs in cracks and crevices, in soil, between leaves, and beneath the sepals on fruits. The larvae emerge in the soil or fall into it upon emergence. There they feed on the roots. In citrus, for example, they physically damage the roots but more significant injury occurs when pathogens such as Phytophthora enter through the wounds. The length of the larval stage varies depending on species, temperature, and nutrients available. The adults feed on foliage.

Some species reproduce via parthenogenesis, with young emerging from unfertilized eggs, and males of the species have never even been observed.

There are at least 150 species in the genus.

== See also ==
- List of Naupactus species
