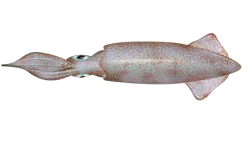

Conservation status
- Least Concern (IUCN 3.1)

Scientific classification
- Kingdom: Animalia
- Phylum: Mollusca
- Class: Cephalopoda
- Order: Myopsida
- Family: Loliginidae
- Genus: Doryteuthis
- Subgenus: Amerigo
- Species: D. opalescens

Binomial name
- Doryteuthis opalescens (Berry, 1911)

Synonyms
- Loligo opalescens Berry, 1911; Loligo stearnsi Hemphill, 1892

= Doryteuthis opalescens =

Opalescent inshore squid

Species of Cephalopoda

Doryteuthis opalescens, the opalescent inshore squid or market squid, is a small species of squid in the family Loliginidae. It is a myopsid squid, a near shore group with corneas over their eyes. The species is found in the eastern Pacific Ocean from Baja California, Mexico to Alaska, United States, and as an inshore squid can be found within a range of 200 miles (320 km) off the coast.

== Description ==
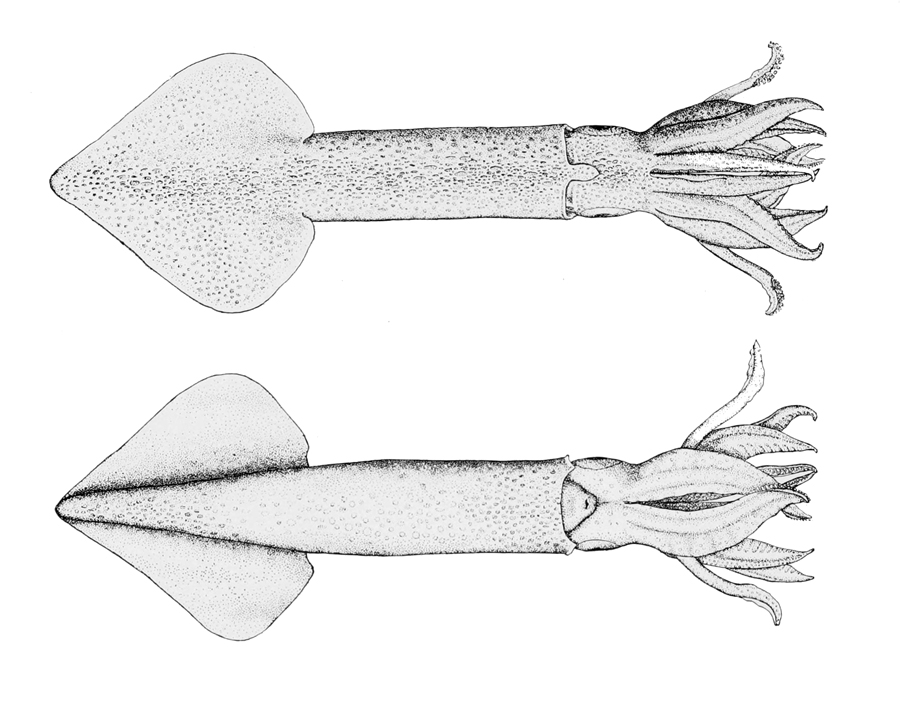
Dorsal (top) and ventral views of adult

Adult Doryteuthis opalescens can reach a total size of 11 inches (28 cm). Males are typically larger with a mantle length of 5 – 3 1/2 inches (7.5 to 9 cm), while females are 5 –7 inches (13 to 19 cm) in mantle length. The mantle of D. opalescens is not fused to the head and its body is 4 to 5 times longer than it is wide, with fins equal in both length and width. This squid has 8 arms with 2 longer tentacles ending in tentacular clubs equipped with suckers at their ends. The tentacular clubs are narrow with 4 rows of suckers and 2 large rows in the center of the tentacular club bordered by outer rows of smaller suckers. The 8 arms have only 2 rows of alternating suckers running down their length. In male D. opalescens, the left ventral arm is specialized or "hectocotylized" for spermatophore transfer during mating. The eyes of D. opalescens are covered with a non-perforated membrane known as a cornea which is a signature of myopsid squid. The color of D. opalescens can range from white to brown, with the animals able to change their color shades using chromatophores depending on mood and for camouflage. They are normally a bluish-white to mottled brown and gold, and they change to dark red or brown when excited, frightened or feeding.

== Misidentification ==
Doryteuthis opalescens is very similar to two other species of squid in the same family: Doryteuthis pealeii from the North Atlantic Coast of North America, and Loligo gahi from the coast of Chile.

== Life history ==
The life cycle of D. opalescens has four stages: eggs, hatchlings (called paralarvae), juveniles, and adults. Squid live for 6–9 months. Doryteuthis opalescens eggs are laid on sandy bottom substrates in 10–50 m depth, although there is a report of a shrimp trawler pulling up eggs from 400 fathoms (730 m). Females encapsulate hundreds of eggs in a sheath that is made of many layers of protein. Bacteria grow between the layers and may serve as an antibiotic for fungal infection. Females insert the egg capsules into the sand with a sticky substance that anchors them in place so that the ocean surge can ventilate them. The presence of eggs on the bottom of tanks stimulates females to lay more eggs. Groups of capsules are placed in masses that can extend into egg beds. Some egg beds can cover acres of the ocean floor. The eggs take 3–8 weeks to hatch with warmer water shortening the incubation time. Bat stars (Asterina miniatus) are the most prevalent predators of eggs. Fish do not eat them, although they will nip at eggs not covered by the capsule sheath. There is no brooding.

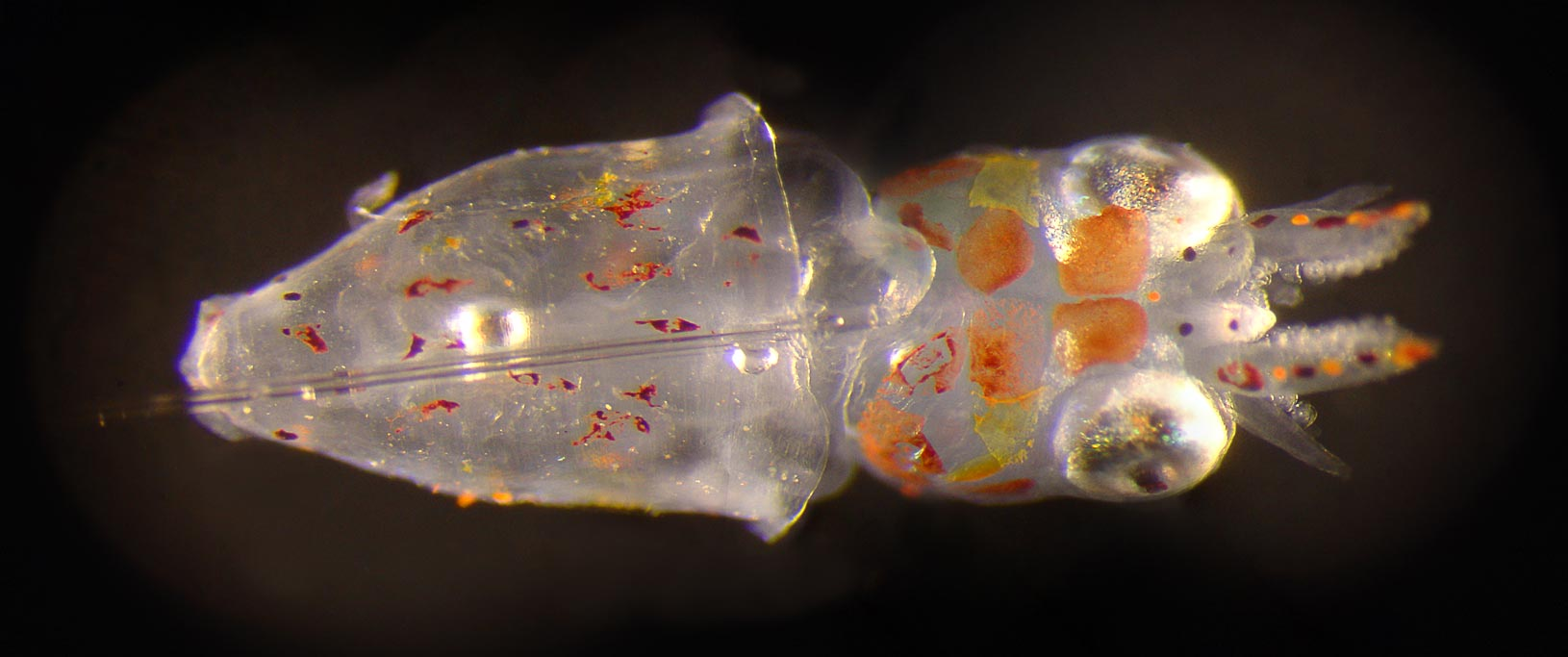
Doryteuthis opalescens paralarva

Paralarvae of D. opalescens hatch from the eggs and immediately begin swimming. Where they go is unknown, but hatchlings of the closely related Loligo pealei swim to the surface in the first 12 hours post-hatching. Paralarvae must rapidly learn to hunt, as their yolk is either used up or detached upon escaping from the egg sheath. Through a series of trial and error as these 2–3 mm ML hatchlings learn to eat copepods and other plankton in the first months of their lives. They are found in the greatest abundance at 15 m depth by night and 30 m depth by day. Thus, they perform a daily vertical migration of 15 meters, no small feat a creature only 3 mm long. This daily migration coupled with the shear zone created by tidal and near-shore currents cause the hatchlings to become entrained within 3 kilometers of shore. That is good for them because in the near-shore environment the plankton is smaller and easier for them to eat.

By the time D. opalescens reaches 15 mm mantle length (about 2 months old) they are strong enough to swim in shoals. These juveniles form groups of tens of individuals and swim over the shelf in search of food. Those that have survived to this point can hunt with the tentacular strike as seen in the adults. At some point between 4–8 months their sexual organs mature and they are now considered adults. Sexually mature animals can be 70–160 mm ML and weigh about 40 grams.

Adult D. opalescens move off the continental shelf by day and can be found to depths of 500 m. Adult shoals return to the surface at night to hunt. At some point these shoals move on shore to spawn where aggregations can reach million of individuals. Originally it was thought that the adults died after spawning, as the egg beds were often littered with dead squid. Now there is debate as to how long adults live after their first egg deposition and whether they can spawn repeatedly over the last weeks or months of their lives. Studies of related loliginid squid (Doryteuthis pealeii) have shown that males employ multiple reproductive tactics—including mate guarding and sneaker strategies—at communal egg beds, suggesting that similar behavioral dynamics may occur in D. opalescens populations.

== Predator and prey relationships ==
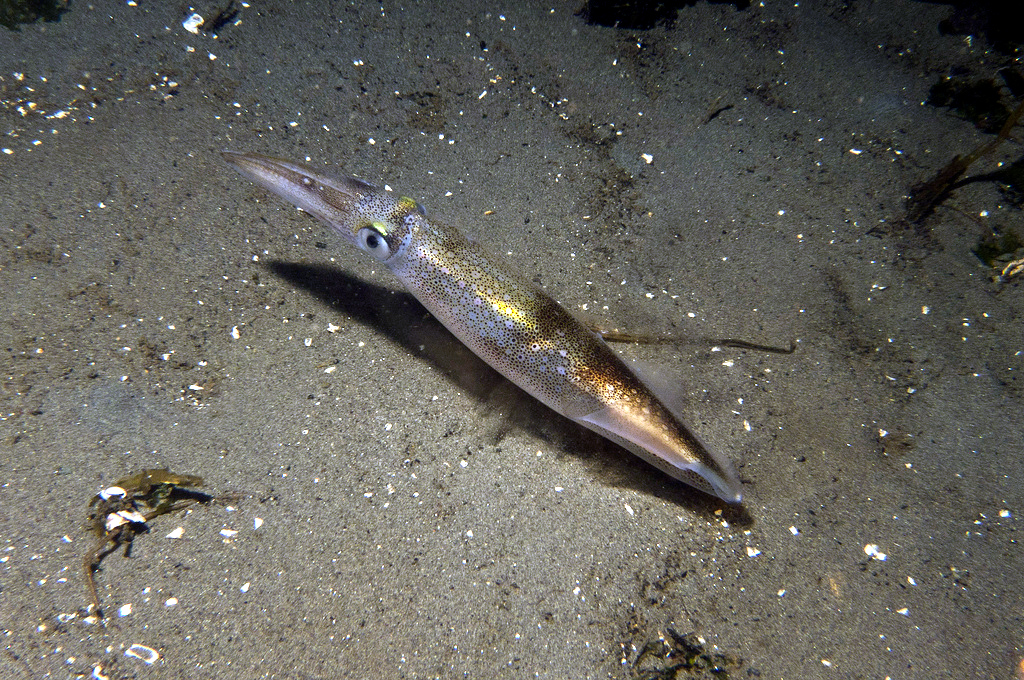
Adult Doryteuthis opalescens

Doryteuthis opalescens is a cannibalistic predator that feeds on smaller prey species such as fish, crabs, shrimp, mollusks, and other juvenile squids. It uses its two longer tentacles with tentacular clubs on the end to snare and catch its prey. Doryteuthis opalescens itself is an important food source for many predators like larger fish, sharks, marine mammals, seabirds, and also humans. Its predators include the California sea lion, blue shark, sail fish, striped tuna, Chinook salmon, black-throated diver, and Brandt's cormorant.

The fishery for D. opalescens began with the Chinese in Monterey Bay, California in 1860. By the turn of the century Italian fishermen had assumed the leading role. After World War II there was a resurgence in squid fishing. Since 1981 the fishery has grown significantly, as efforts in Southern California have increased. Now Southern California, mostly areas around the Channel Islands, comprises 90% of the squid landings. The fishery in Monterey Bay occurs from April to November coinciding with the upwelling season. In Southern California landings begin in November and continue through April correlated with the greater mixing of winter storms. Since 1993 squid has been the #1 fishery in California with landings of 118,000 metric tons and $41 million in 2000. The population fluctuates greatly with the El Niño. During these warm water and nutrient poor years landings can disappear entirely in certain areas.

Between 1998 and 2019, studies found that D. opalescens populations in more northerly U.S. Pacific Coast waters have increased significantly. This was linked to ocean temperature increases due to climate change.
