= Doryteuthis sanpaulensis =

Conservation status
- Least Concern (IUCN 3.1)

Scientific classification
- Kingdom: Animalia
- Phylum: Mollusca
- Class: Cephalopoda
- Order: Myopsida
- Family: Loliginidae
- Genus: Doryteuthis
- Species: D. sanpaulensis

Binomial name
- Doryteuthis sanpaulensis (Brakoniecki, 1984)

Synonyms
- Loligo brasiliensis

Species of squid

Doryteuthis sanpaulensis, commonly known as the São Paulo squid, is a species of squid in the family Loliginidae. It is found in the southwestern Atlantic Ocean, along the eastern coast of South America, up to northern Patagonia.

== Description ==
D. sanpaulensis have a moderately long mantle, averaging 16 cm in length for females and 20 cm for males, but has been recorded up to 22 cm in length. It has long tentacles with expanded clubs and large suckers with about 25 teeth each. Arms are moderately long, suckers with 5-7 teeth. The left ventral arm is hectocotylised in the distal 45%. Gladius long and slender, without lateral thickening.

Spermatophores are small and slender in shape and have a smooth body, and eggs are about 1.3 mm in length and ovular. Females have a sperm-storing organ inside the mantle cavity, as males transfer spermatophores to the region during mating.

As a hatchling, D. sanpaulensis range in length between 1.4 to 1.7 mm. Chromatophores vary across the body; the ventral side is largely made of red and yellow chromatophores, while the dorsal is solely yellow. the mantle contains three, arranged in a triangle posteriorly. Paralarvae range from 1.1 to 1.4 mm, with a mantle bell shaped and rounded, and fins paddle-shaped. The head is squarish and narrower than the mantle margin.

== Distribution ==
The squid is found in the south-western Atlantic Ocean, from southern Brazil to northern Patagonia, where it is the most abundant coastal squid. It is found at depths of up to 140 meters, populations more concentrated in colder waters. Paralarvae and juveniles are most abundant at depths over 55 meters off of the continental shelf of Brazil, but have been collected at 17 m and 20 m off of Patagonia and the extreme south of Brazil, respectively.

== Biology ==
Spawning is variable in D. saupaulensis, as northern population spawn year round - peaking at winter and summer, but southern and midrange populations spawn in spring and autumn. The number of eggs per mass varies between 10 and 400, embryonic development taking about 16 days. Egg masses are found on sandy or muddy bottoms at depths of 5 to 15 m and are composed of capsules in different stages of developments, due to being laid by different females at different times. Egg capsules consist of 240 to 320 eggs arranged in spiralling rows, interspersed with a jelly-like material. Each capsule is stalked, connecting it to the other capsules and to the substrate.

D. saupaulensis are considered bottom feeders, mainly feeding on fish, cephalopods, polychaetes, and crustaceans, but have been recorded feeding on other individuals of the same species. Cannibalism has been found to be frequent in juveniles. It is preyed on by fish, squid, marine mammals, fish, and sharks, notably the Franciscana and tucuxi dolphins, fur seals and the benthic dog shark.

The squid has an average life span of 229 days, but has been recorded living up to 327 days. Squid hatched in spring and summer show faster growth rates than those in autumn and winter, most likely due to the food-rich nature of the region in summer.

== Behaviour ==
D. saupaulensis tend to migrate from nearshore nursing grounds to deepwater, returning to the nursing grounds when mature. Larger individuals tend to be found in deeper water, while smaller and younger individuals are found in shallower waters, in areas of high plankton production. Small juveniles are commonly found inshore during summer. In Argentina, individuals migrate northward in winter, to reproduce and feed.

D. saupaulensis juveniles have been recorded mixing into a single school alongside juveniles of the species D. plei.

== Fisheries ==
The species is not of high interest to fisheries, and is often caught as bycatch or by hand jigging. It is largely caught as bycatch in double rig trawlers for coastal shrimp.
