= Doryteuthis roperi =

Conservation status
- Data Deficient (IUCN 3.1)

Scientific classification
- Kingdom: Animalia
- Phylum: Mollusca
- Class: Cephalopoda
- Order: Myopsida
- Family: Loliginidae
- Genus: Doryteuthis
- Species: D. roperi

Binomial name
- Doryteuthis roperi (Cohen, 1976)

Synonyms
- Doryteuthis (Doryteuthis) roperi (Cohen, 1976); Loligo roperi Cohen, 1976

Species of squid

Doryteuthis roperi, commonly known as the roper inshore squid, is a small-sized species of squid in the Loliginidae family. It has a maximum mantle length of 72 mm (2.8 in). It is found in the Western Atlantic Ocean; the Caribbean Sea and the Gulf of Mexico, at a depth of between 45 and 304 m (148 and 997 ft).

== Description ==
Doryteuthis roperi has a long, slender mantle and rhomboidal shaped fins.
