= Doryteuthis surinamensis =

Conservation status
- Data Deficient (IUCN 3.1)

Scientific classification
- Kingdom: Animalia
- Phylum: Mollusca
- Class: Cephalopoda
- Order: Myopsida
- Family: Loliginidae
- Genus: Doryteuthis
- Species: D. surinamensis

Binomial name
- Doryteuthis surinamensis (G.L.Voss, 1974)

Species of squid

Doryteuthis surinamensis, also known as the Surinam squid, is a small species of squid in the Loliginidae family. It is found in the west South Atlantic Ocean, off the coast of Suriname, in depths between 27 and 37 meters. It grows to up to 12cm.
