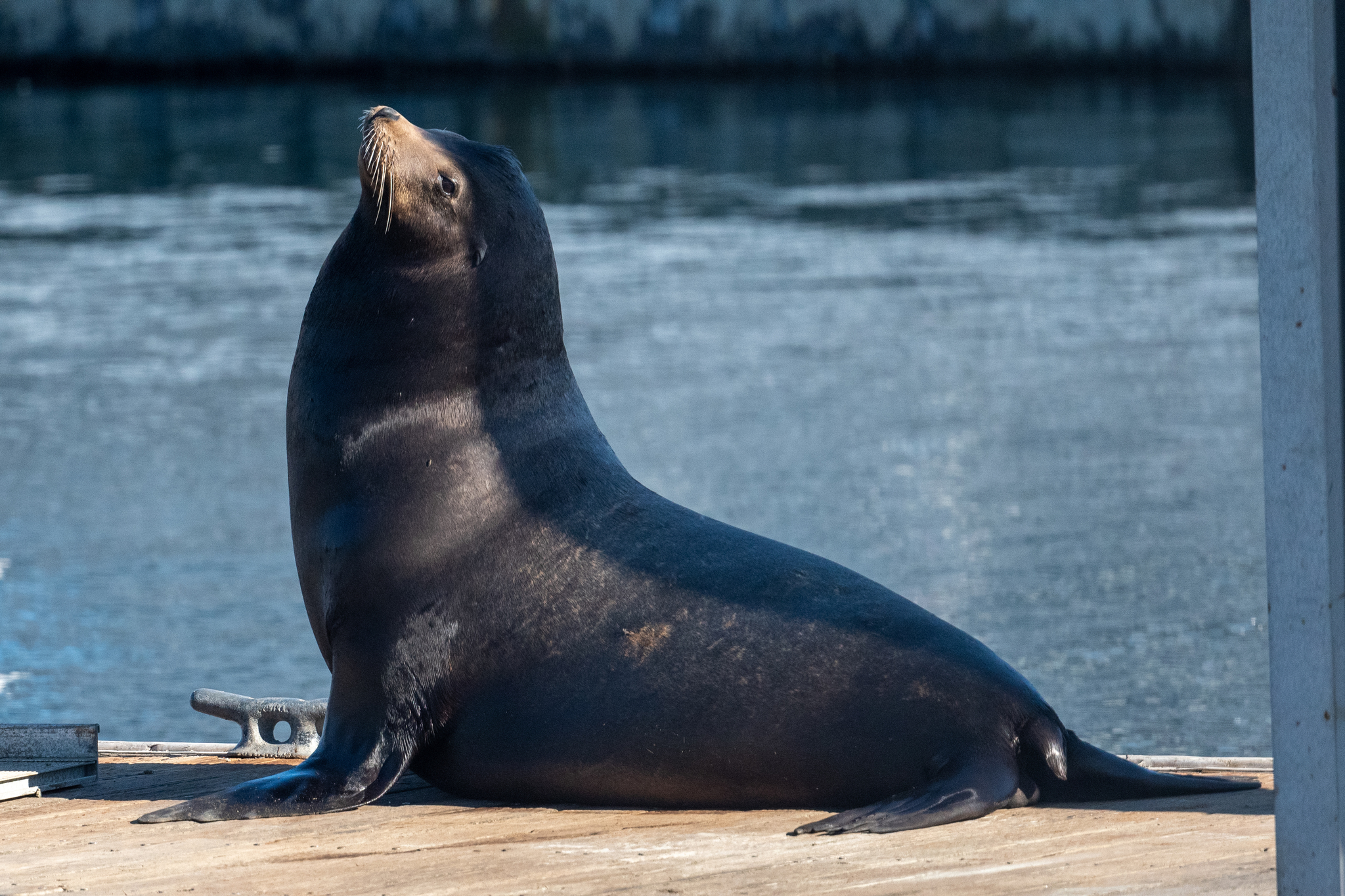
- Male, in Monterey, California
- Female, in La Jolla, California

Conservation status
- Least Concern (IUCN 3.1)

Scientific classification
- Kingdom: Animalia
- Phylum: Chordata
- Class: Mammalia
- Order: Carnivora
- Parvorder: Pinnipedia
- Family: Otariidae
- Genus: Zalophus
- Species: Z. californianus

Binomial name
- Zalophus californianus (Lesson, 1828)
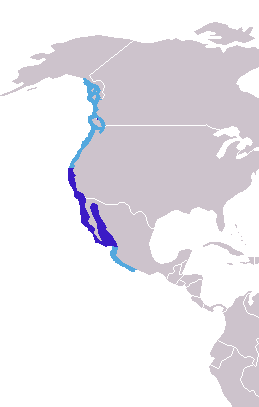
- breeding range total range

= California sea lion =

California sea lion Temporal range: Pleistocene–Recent

Species of carnivore

The California sea lion (Zalophus californianus) is a coastal eared seal native to western North America. It is one of six species of sea lions. Its natural habitat ranges from southeast Alaska to central Mexico, including the Gulf of California. California sea lions are sexually dimorphic; males are larger than females, and have a thicker neck, and a protruding sagittal crest. They mainly haul out on sandy or rocky beaches, but they also frequent manmade environments such as marinas and wharves. California sea lions feed on a number of species of fish and squid, and are preyed on by orcas and great white sharks.

California sea lions have a polygynous breeding pattern. From May to August, males establish territories and try to attract females with which to mate. Females are free to move in between territories, and are not coerced by males. Mothers nurse their pups in between foraging trips. California sea lions communicate with numerous vocalizations, notably with barks and mother-pup contact calls. Outside their breeding season, California sea lions spend much of their time at sea, but they come to shore to molt.

California sea lions are particularly intelligent, can be trained to perform various tasks and display limited fear of humans if accustomed to them. Because of this, California sea lions are a popular choice for public display in zoos, circuses and oceanariums, and are trained by the United States Navy for certain military operations. The International Union for Conservation of Nature (IUCN) lists the species as Least Concern due to its abundance. To protect fish, the US states of Oregon and Washington engage in annual kill quotas of California sea lions.

== Taxonomy ==
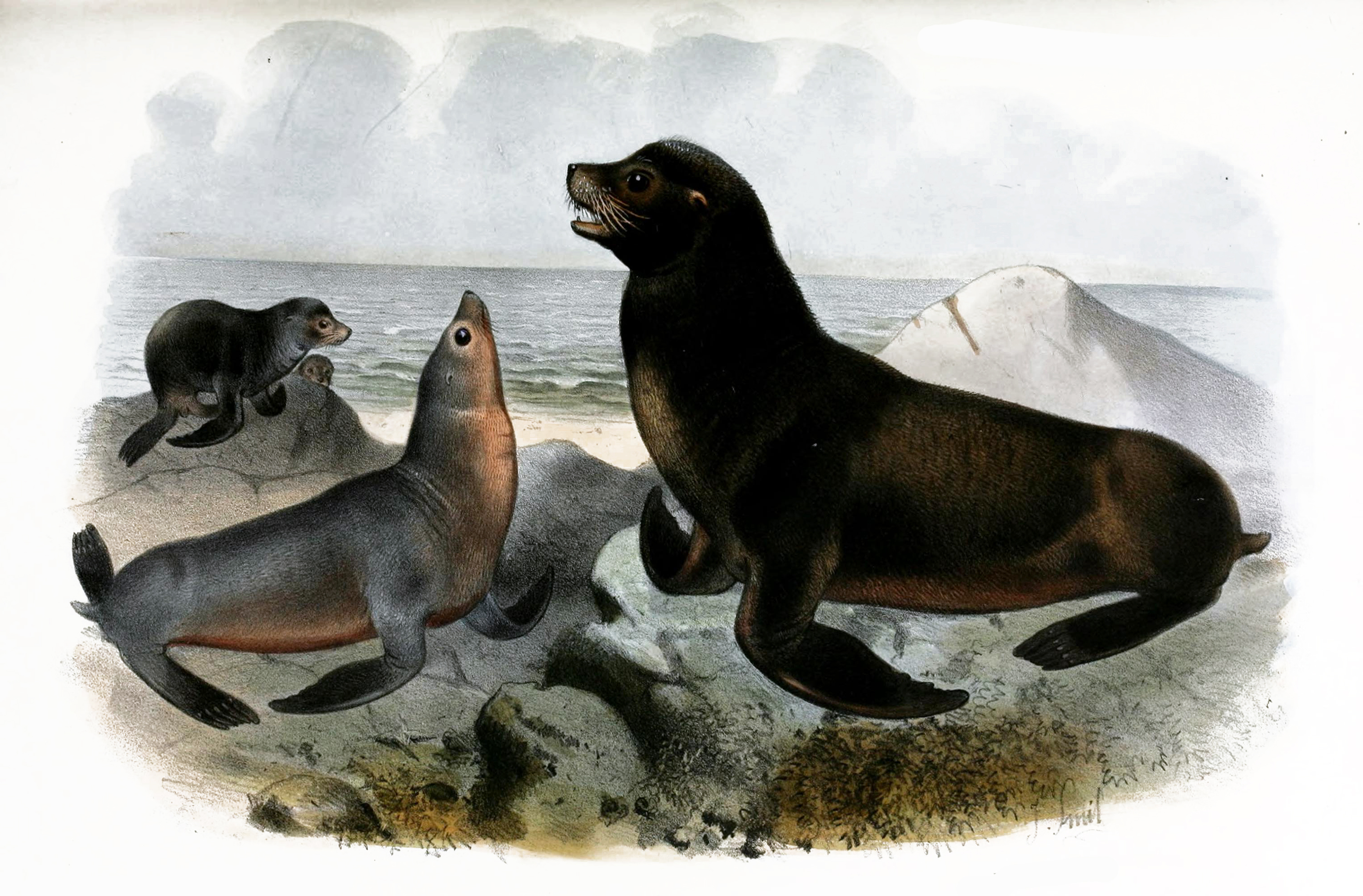
Lithography by Joseph Smit

The California sea lion was described by René-Primevère Lesson, a French naturalist, in 1828. It is grouped with other sea lions and fur seals in the family Otariidae. Otariids, also known as eared seals, differ from true seals in having external ear flaps, and proportionately larger foreflippers and pectoral muscles. Along with the Galapagos sea lion and the extinct Japanese sea lion, the California sea lion belongs to the genus Zalophus, which derives from the Greek words za, meaning "intensive", and lophus, meaning "crest". This refers to the protruding sagittal crest of the males, which distinguishes members of the genus.

Traditionally, the Galapagos sea lion and Japanese sea lion were classified as subspecies of the California sea lion. However, a genetic study in 2007 found that all three are in fact separate species. The lineages of the California and Japanese sea lion appear to have split off 2.2 million years ago during the Pliocene. The California sea lion differs from the Galapagos sea lion in its greater sexual dimorphism. The Steller sea lion is the closest extant relative of the Zalophus sea lions, being a sister taxon.

== Distribution and habitat ==
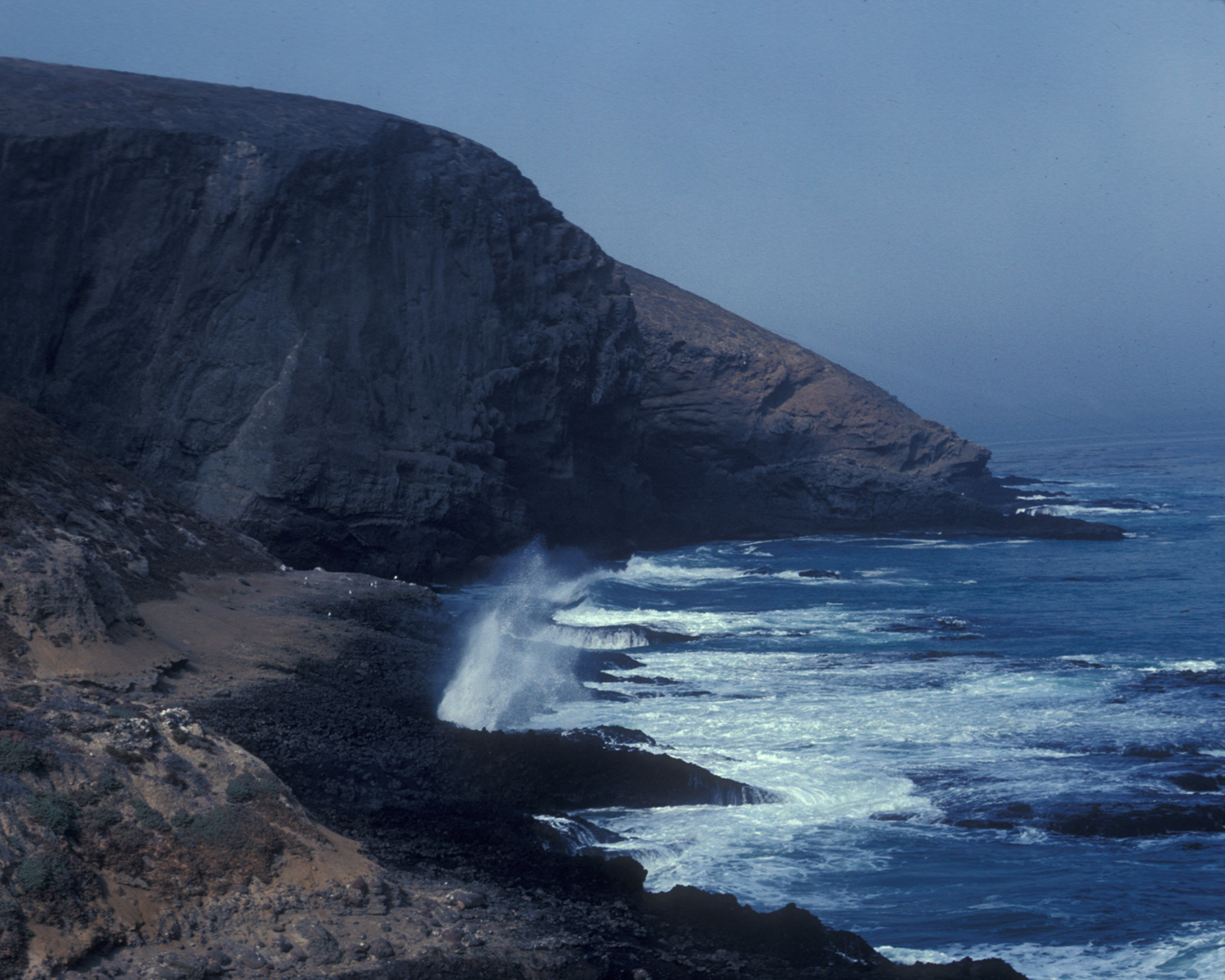
California sea lion rookery on Santa Barbara Island

The California sea lion ranges along the western coast and islands of North America, from southeast Alaska to central Mexico. Mitochondrial DNA sequences in 2009 have identified five distinct California sea lion populations: the U.S. or Pacific Temperate stock, the Western Baja California or Pacific Tropical stock, and the Southern, Central, and Northern Gulf of California stocks. The U.S. stock breeds mainly in the Channel Islands, although some breeding sites may be established in northern California, and females are now commonly found there. The Western Baja California stock mainly breeds near Punta Eugenia and at Isla Santa Margarita. The above-mentioned stocks are separated by the Ensenada Front. The stocks of the Gulf of California live in the shallow waters of the north (Northern stock), the tidal islands near the center (Central stock), and the mouth of the bay (Southern stock). The stock status of the California sea lions at the deep waters of the central bay has not been analyzed.

Vagrants can reach the north-western Pacific such as on the Commander Islands. Although several otariinae have been recorded around the Japanese archipelago in recent years, their exact origins are unclear.

During the breeding season, California sea lions gather on both sandy and rocky shores. On warm days, they lie closer to the water. At night or in cool weather, they travel farther inland or to higher elevations. Non-breeding individuals may gather at marinas, wharves, or even navigational buoys. California sea lions can also live in fresh water for periods of time, such as near Bonneville Dam, nearly 150 miles (240 km) up the Columbia River. In 2004, a healthy California sea lion was found sitting on a road in Merced County, California, almost a hundred miles upstream from the San Francisco Bay and half a mile from the San Joaquin River.

== Appearance, physiology, and movement ==
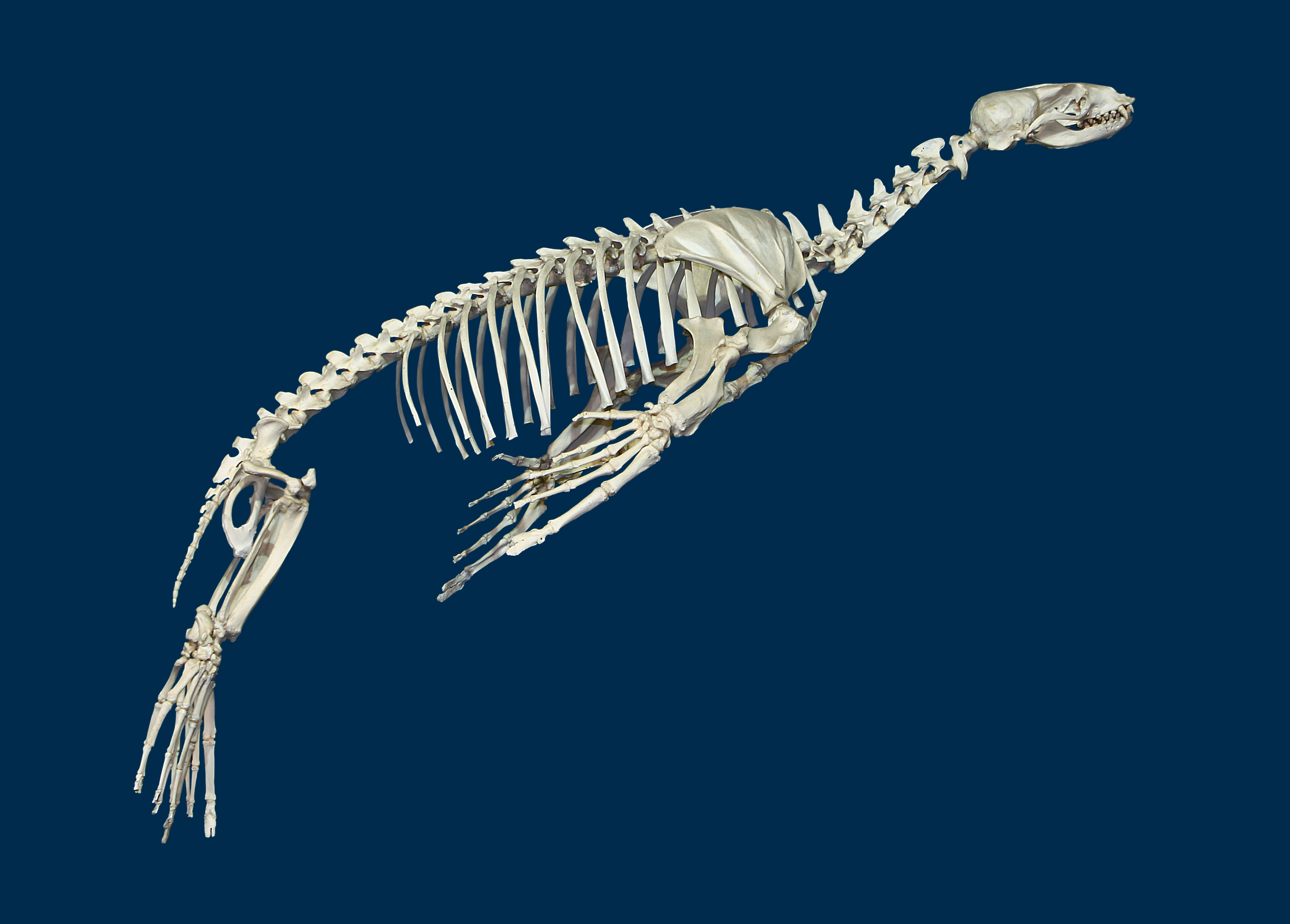
California sea lion skeleton

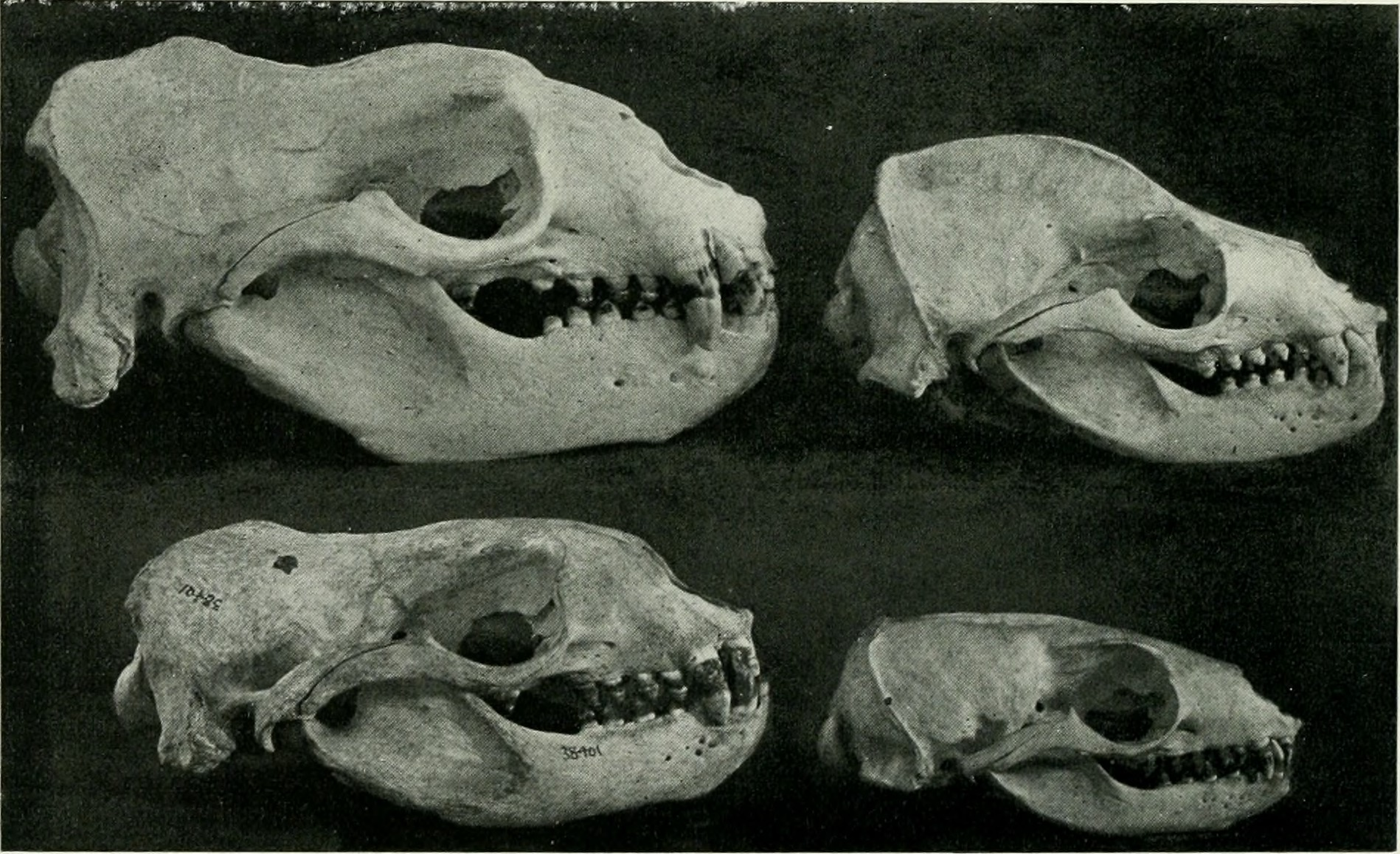
Skulls of Steller sea lions (♂ and ♀) on the left, compared to California sea lions (♂ and ♀) on the right

Being sexually dimorphic, California sea lions differ in size, shape, and coloration between the sexes. Males can grow up to 2.5–2.7 m (8.2–8.9 ft) long and weigh around 350 kg (770 lb), while females are typically around 2.1 m (6.9 ft) and weigh around 100 kg (220 lb). The heaviest recorded male weighed 660 kg (1,460 lb).

Females and juveniles have a tawny brown pelage, although they may be temporarily light gray or silver after molting. The pelage of adult males can be anywhere from light brown to black, but is typically dark brown. The face of adult males may also be light tan in some areas. Pups have a black or dark brown pelage at birth.

Although the species has a slender build, adult males have robust necks, chests, and shoulders. Adult males also have a protruding crest which gives them a "high, domed forehead"; it is tufted with white hairs. They also have manes, which are less developed than those of adult male South American and Steller sea lions. Both sexes have long, narrow muzzles.

=== Locomotion ===
As an otariid, the California sea lion relies on its foreflippers to propel itself when swimming. This form of aquatic locomotion, along with its streamlined body, effectively reduces drag underwater. Its foreflipper movement is not continuous; the animal glides in between each stroke. The flexibility of its spine allows the California sea lion to bend its neck backwards far enough to reach its hindflippers. This allows the animal to make dorsal turns and maintain a streamlined posture. When moving on land, the California sea lion is able to turn its hindflippers forward and walk on all fours. It moves the foreflippers in a transverse, rather than a sagittal, fashion. In addition, it relies on movements of its head and neck more than its hindflippers for terrestrial locomotion. California sea lions may travel at speeds of around 10.8 km/h (6.7 mph), and can dive at depths of 274 m (899 ft) and for up to 9.9 minutes, though most dives are typically 80 m (260 ft) and last less than 3 minutes.

=== Senses ===
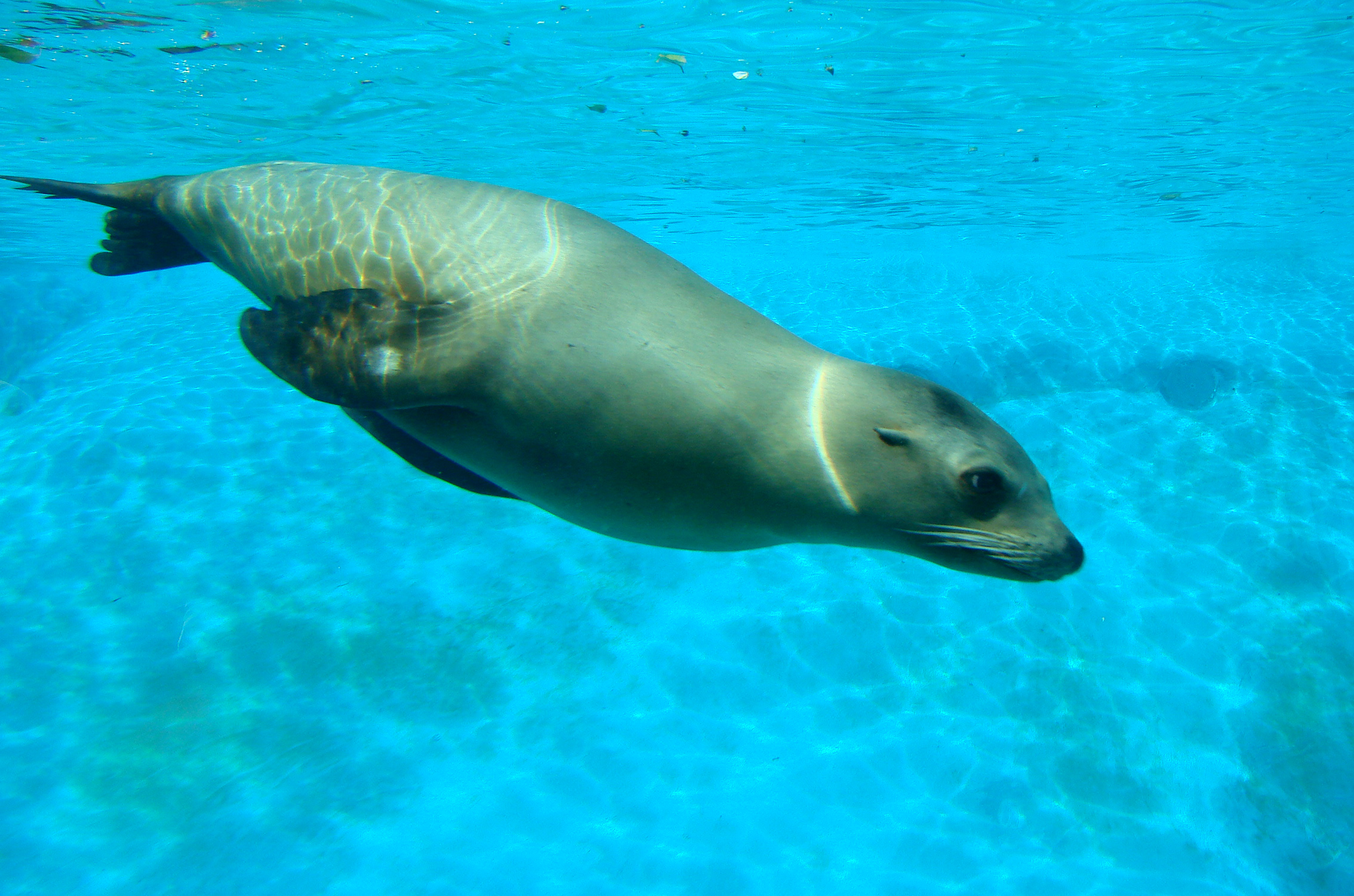
Swimming underwater (Amneville Zoo)

California sea lions have color vision, though it is limited to the blue-green area of the color spectrum. This is likely an adaptation for living in marine coastal habitats. Sea lions have fairly acute underwater hearing, with a hearing range of 0.4–32 kHz. California sea lions rely on their whiskers or vibrissae for touch and detection of vibrations underwater. Compared to the harbor seal, the California sea lion's vibrissae are smoother and less specialized and thus perform less when following hydrodynamic trails, although they still perform well.

== Ecology ==
=== Diet ===
California sea lions feed on a wide variety of seafood, mainly octopus, squid and fish, and sometimes clams. Commonly eaten fish and squid species include salmon, hake, Pacific whiting, anchovy, herring, rockfish, lamprey, dogfish, and market squid. They mostly forage near mainland coastlines, the continental shelf, and seamounts. They may also search along the ocean bottom. California sea lions may eat alone or in small to large groups, depending on the amount of food available. They sometimes cooperate with other predators, such as dolphins, porpoises, and seabirds, when hunting large schools of fish. California sea lions sometimes follow dolphins and exploit their hunting efforts. Adult females feed between 10–100 km (6.2–62.1 mi) from shore. Adult males may forage as far as 450 km (280 mi) from shore when water temperatures rise. They also have learned to feed on steelhead and salmon below fish ladders at Bonneville Dam and at other locations where fish must queue in order to pass through dams and locks that block their passage.

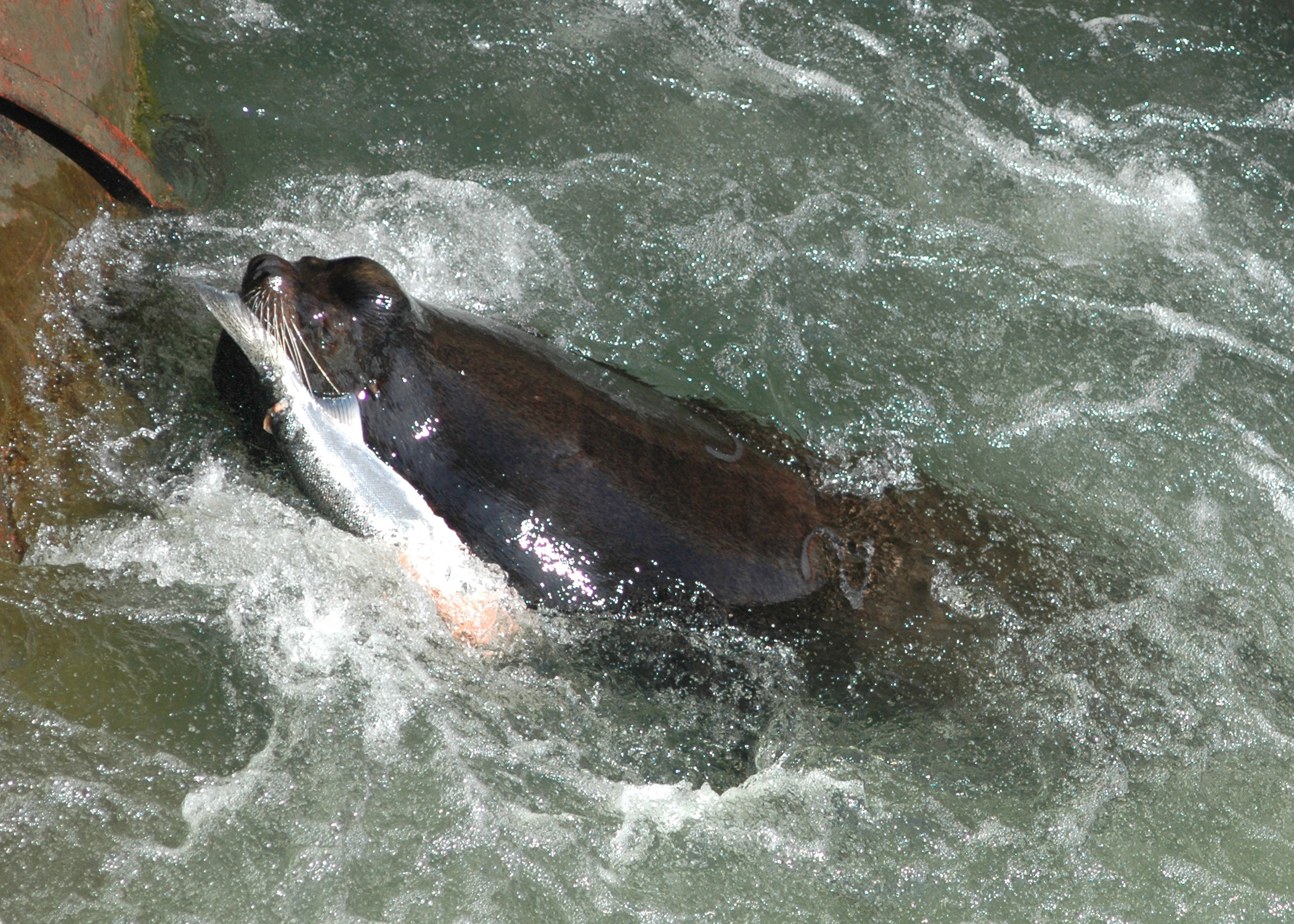
Eating salmon

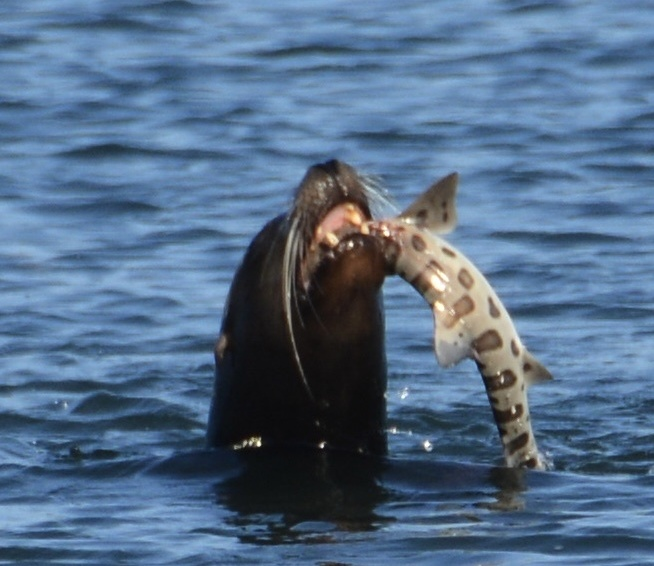
Eating a leopard shark

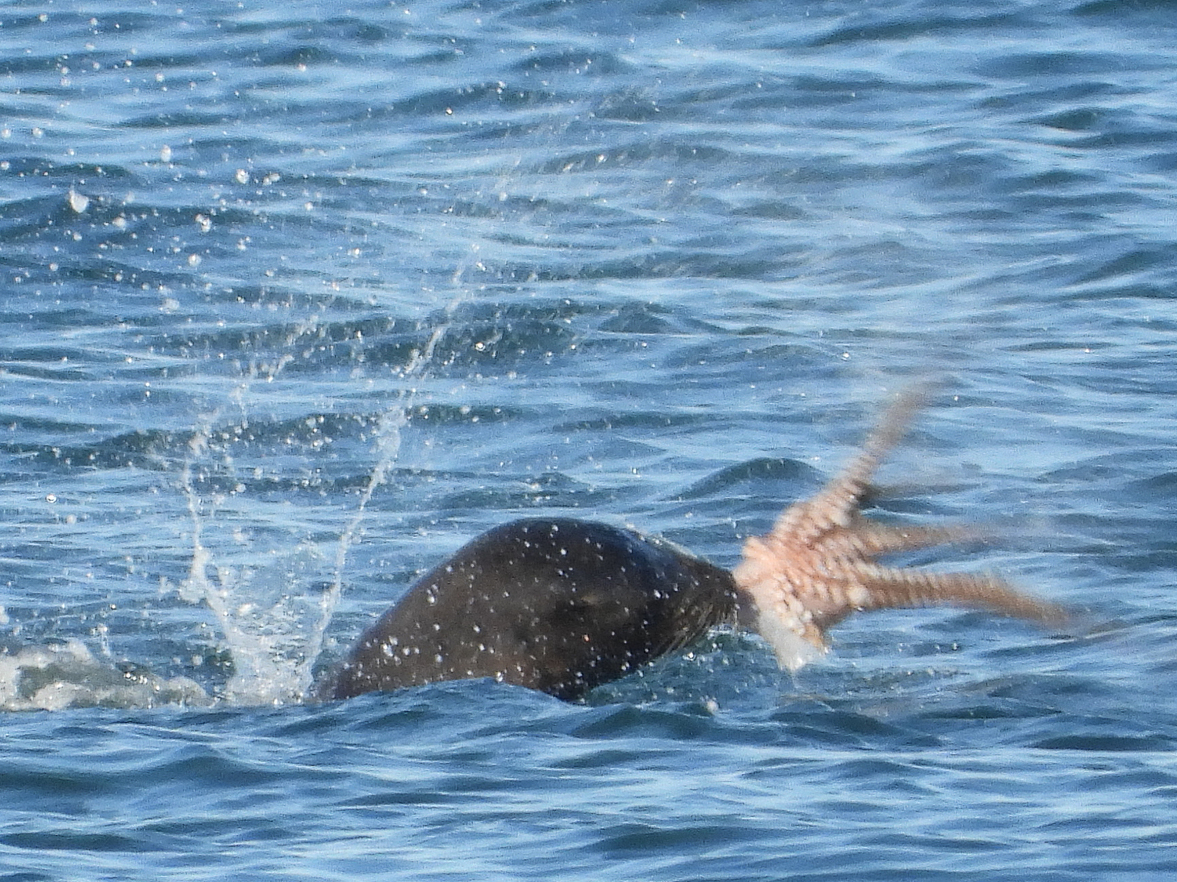
Eating a California two-spot octopus

=== Predation ===
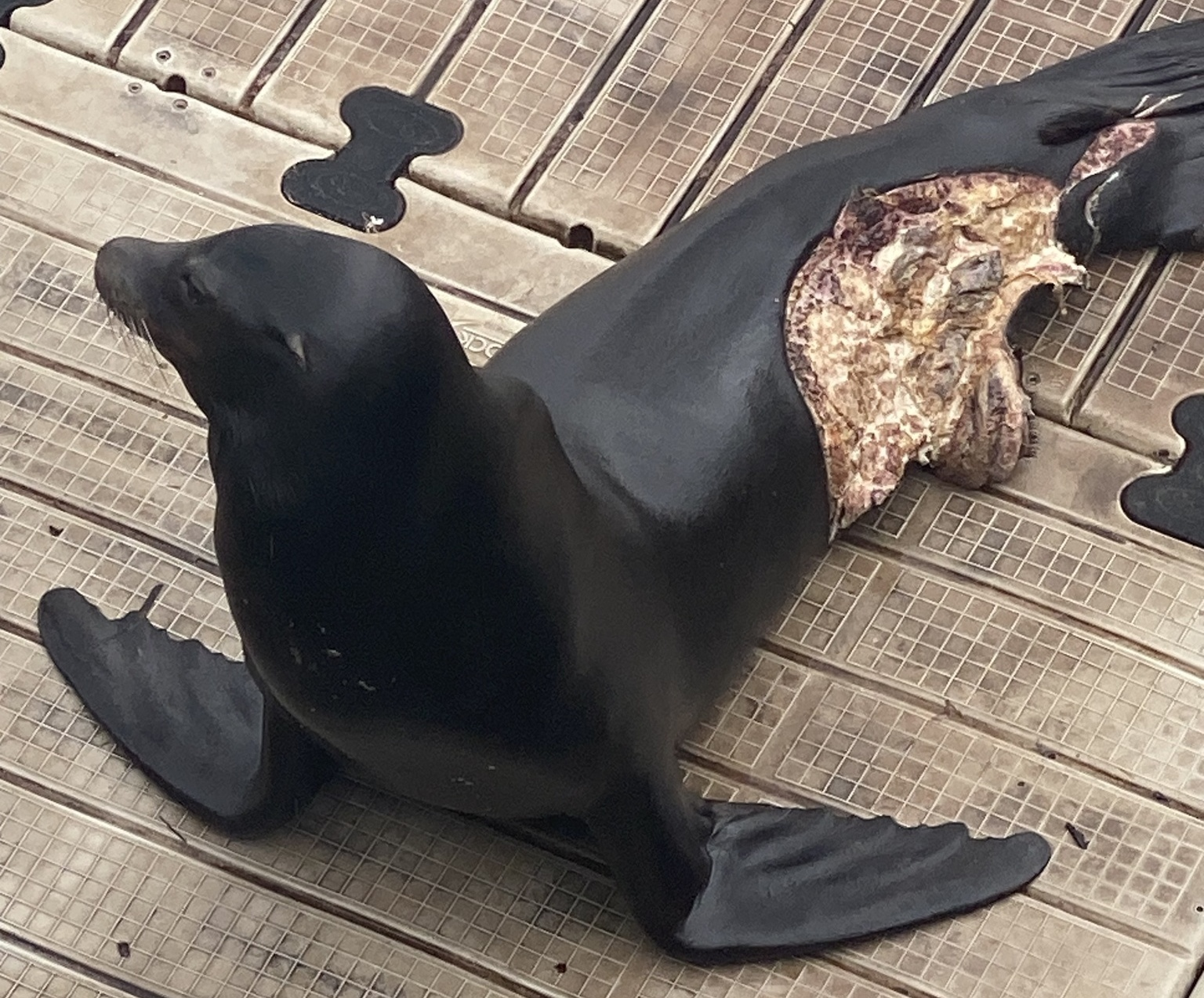
California sea lion that had been bitten by a large shark, in Oregon

California sea lions are preyed on by orcas and large sharks. At Monterey Bay, California sea lions appear to be the more common food items for transient mammal-eating orcas pods. The California sea lions may respond to the dorsal fin of a killer whale and remain vigilant, even when encountering resident fish-eating pods. California sea lions are also common prey for great white sharks. They have been found with scars made by attacks from both great white sharks and shortfin mako sharks. Sharks attack California sea lions by ambushing them while they are resting at the surface. California sea lions that are attacked in the hindquarters are more likely to survive and make it to the shore.

== Life history ==
=== Reproductive behavior and parenting ===
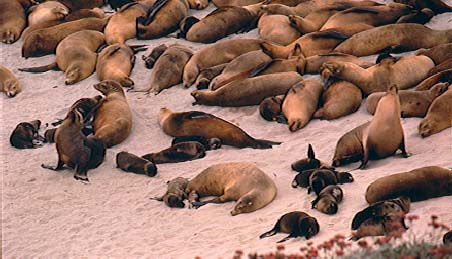
California sea lion rookery

California sea lions breed gregariously between May and August, when they arrive at their breeding rookeries. When establishing a territory, the males will try to increase their chances of reproducing by staying on the rookery for as long as possible. During this time, they will fast, relying on a thick layer of fat called blubber for energy. Size and patience allow a male to defend his territory more effectively; the bigger the male, the more blubber he can store and the longer he can wait. A male California sea lion usually keeps his territory for around 27 days. Females have long parturition intervals, and thus the males do not establish their territories until after the females give birth. Most fights occur during this time. After this, the males rely on ritualized displays (vocalizations, head-shaking, stares, bluff lunges, and so on) to maintain their territorial boundaries. Since temperatures can reach over 30 °C (86 °F) during this time, males must include water within their territories. Some territories are underwater, particularly those near steep cliffs. California sea lions that fail to establish a territory are driven out to sea or gather at a nearby beach.

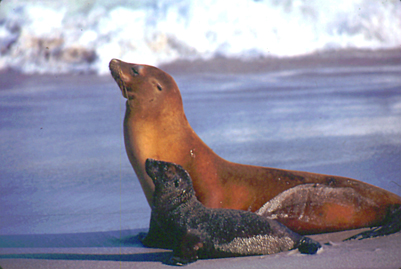
California sea lion mother with pup

Before mating begins, females gather into "milling" groups of 2–20 individuals. The females in these groups will mount each other as well as the males. These groups begin to disintegrate as the females begin to mate. The territorial and mating system of the California sea lion has been described as similar to a lek system, as females appear to choose their mates while moving through different territories. They avoid males that are too aggressive or energetic. Males are usually unable to prevent females from leaving their territories, particularly in water. Mating may occur outside the rookeries, between non-territorial males and females, as the latter move to and from the mating site. In some rookeries, copulation may be monopolized by a few males, while at others, a single male may sire no more than four pups.

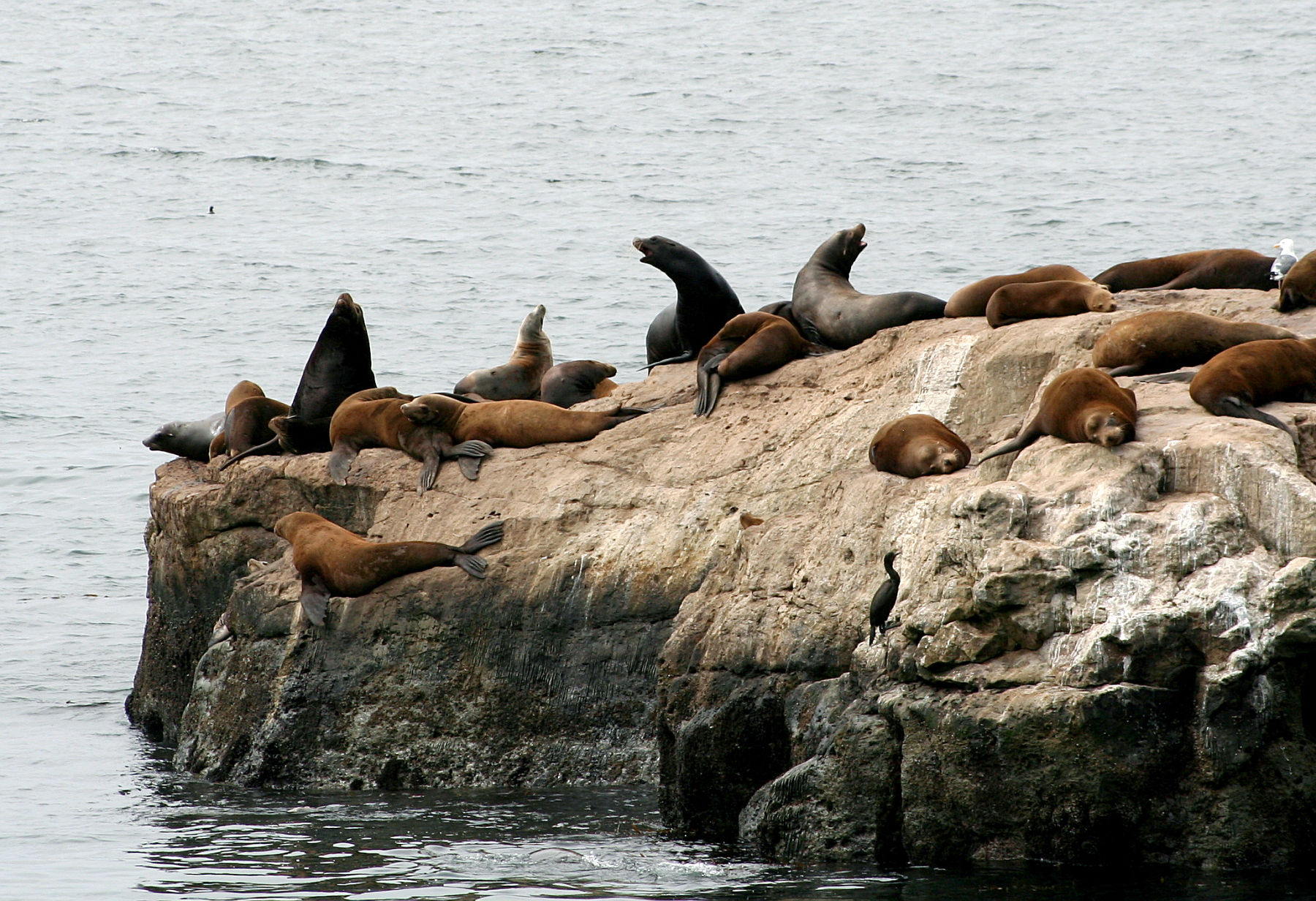
In Santa Cruz, California

Female California sea lions have a 12-month reproductive cycle. A three-month delayed implantation period proceeds nine months of gestation before females give birth in June or July. After giving birth, it takes approximately 21-30 days for these sea lions to return to estrous. Females remain with their pups onshore for 10 days and nurse them. After this, females will go on foraging trips lasting as long as three days, returning to nurse their pups for up to a day. Pups left onshore tend to gather in nurseries to socialize and play. When returning from a trip, females call their pups with distinctive calls to which the pups will reply in kind. A mother and pup can distinguish each other's calls from those of other mothers and pups. At first, reunions largely depend on the efforts of the mothers. However, as pups get older, they get more involved in reunions. Older pups may sometimes join their mothers during their foraging trips. Adult male California sea lions play no role in raising pups, but they do take more interest in them than adult males of other otariid species; they have even been observed to help shield swimming pups from predators. Pups are weaned by a year but can continue to suckle for another year.

=== Communication ===
Barking California sea lions pursuing a boat

California sea lions communicate with a range of vocalizations. The most commonly used one is their characteristic bark. Territorial males are the loudest and most continuous callers, and barks are produced constantly during the peak of the breeding season. California sea lions bark especially rapidly when excited. The barks of territorial and non-territorial males sound similar, although those of the former are deeper. Males may bark when threatening other males or during courtship. The only other vocalization made by territorial males is a "prolonged hoarse grunt sound" made when an individual is startled by a human. This vocalization is also made by groups of non-reproductive males.

Female California sea lions are less vocal. Their barks, high-pitched and shorter than those made by males, are used in aggressive situations. Other aggressive vocalizations given by females include the "squeal", the "belch", and the "growl". The sound a female California sea lion gives when calling her pups is called a "pup-attraction call", described as "loud" and "brawling". Pups respond with a "mother-response call", which is similar in structure. Pups will also bleat or bark when playing or in distress. California sea lions can produce vocalizations underwater. These include "whinny" sounds, barks, buzzings, and clicks.

=== Nonbreeding activities ===
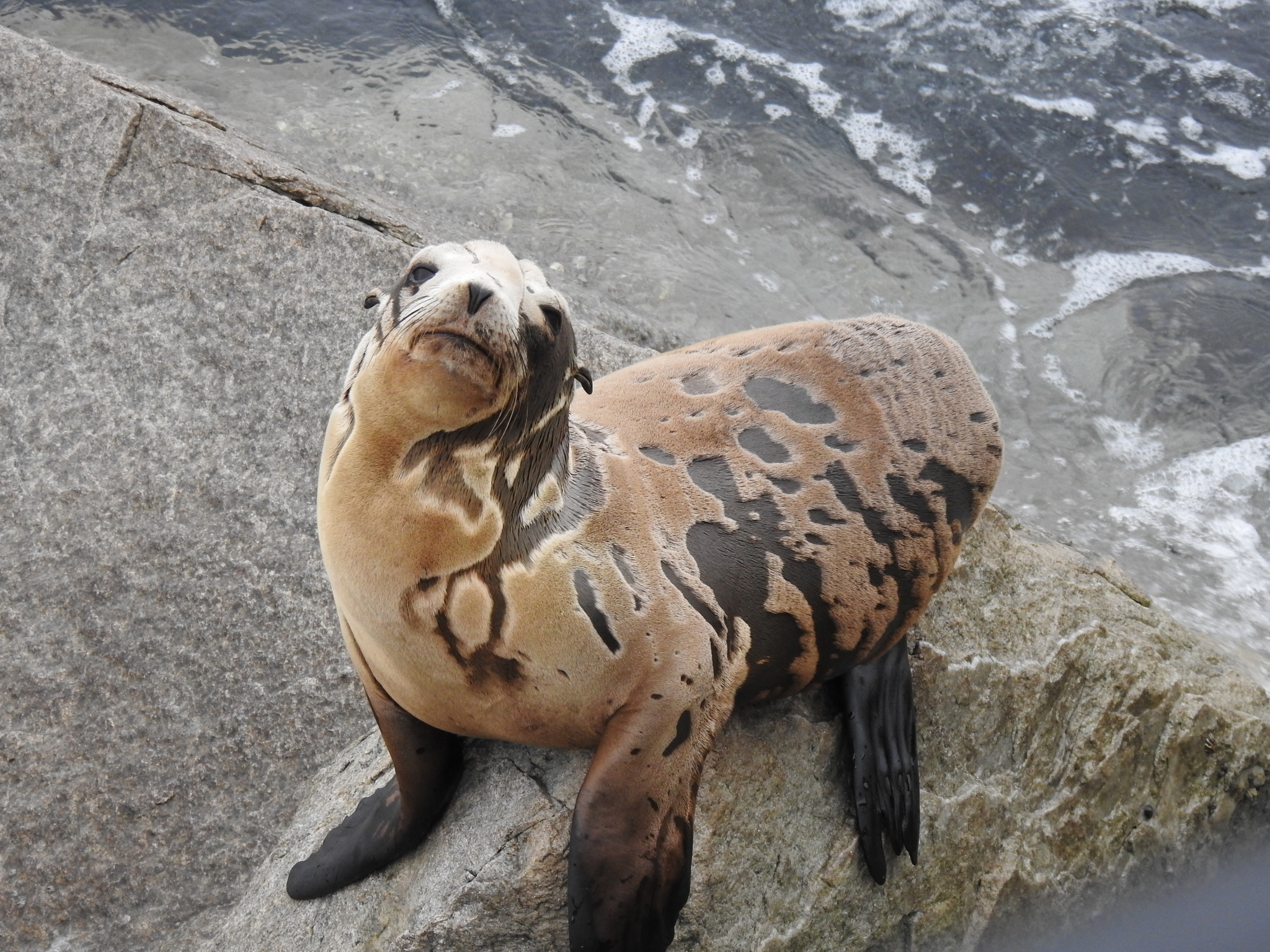
Molting, in California

Outside the breeding season, males migrate to the northern ends of the species range to feed, while females forage near the breeding rookeries. California sea lions can stay at sea for as long as two weeks at a time. They make continuous dives, returning to the surface to rest. California sea lions may travel alone or in groups while at sea and haul-out between each sea trip. Adult females and juveniles molt in autumn and winter; adult males molt in January and February. California sea lions in the Gulf of California do not migrate; they stay in the Gulf of California year-round.

== Intelligence and trainability ==
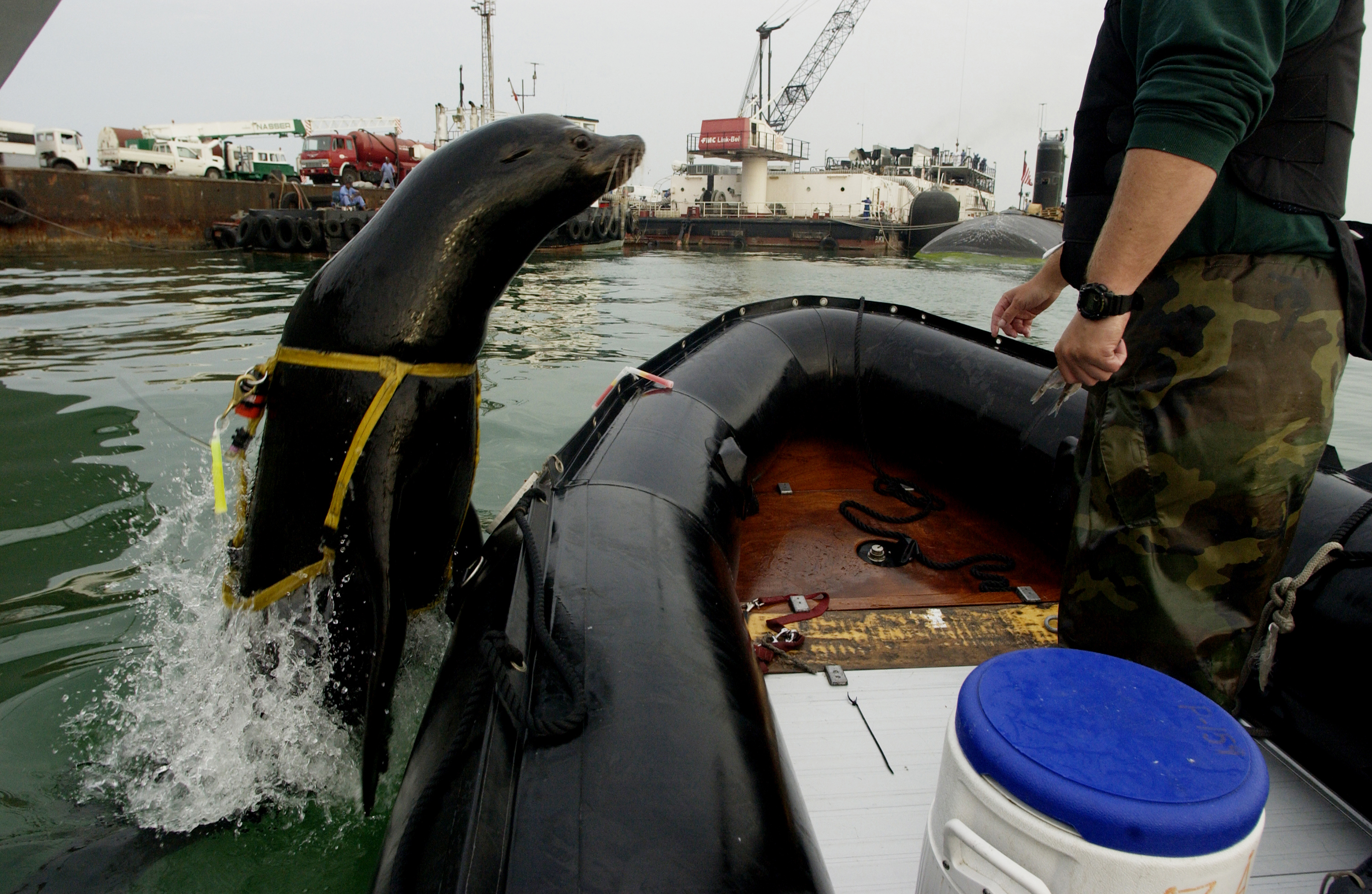
Zak, a 375 lb (170 kg) California sea lion of the Navy, leaps back into the boat after a harbor-patrol training mission.

Marine biologist Ronald J. Schusterman and his research associates have studied the California sea lions' cognitive ability. They have discovered that California sea lions are able to recognize relationships between stimuli based on similar functions or connections made with their peers, rather than only the stimuli's common features. California sea lions have demonstrated the ability to understand simple syntax and commands when taught an artificial sign language. However, California sea lions rarely used the signs semantically or logically. In 2011, a California sea lion named Ronan was recorded bobbing her head in synchronization to musical rhythms. This "rhythmic entrainment" was previously seen only in humans, parrots and other birds possessing vocal mimicry.

Captive California sea lion performing

Because of their intelligence and trainability, California sea lions have been used by circuses and marine mammal parks to perform various tricks such as throwing and catching balls on their noses, running up ladders, or honking horns in a musical fashion. Trainers reward their animals with fish, which motivates them to perform. For ball balancing, trainers toss a ball at a California sea lion so it may accidentally balance it or hold the ball on its nose, thereby gaining an understanding of what to do. A California sea lion may go through a year of training before performing a behavior for the public. However, its memory allows it to perform a behavior even after three months of resting. Some organizations, such as the Humane Society of the United States and World Animal Protection, object to using California sea lions and other marine mammals for entertainment, claiming the tricks are "exaggerated variations of their natural behaviors" and distract the audience from the animal's unnatural environment.

The California sea lion is used in military applications by the U.S. Navy Marine Mammal Program, including detecting naval mines and enemy divers. In the Persian Gulf, the animals can swim behind divers approaching a US naval ship and attach a clamp with a rope to the diver's leg. Navy officials say California sea lions can do this in seconds, before the enemy realizes what happened. Organizations like PETA believe that such operations put the animals in danger. However, the Navy insists that California sea lions are removed once their mission is complete.

== Status ==
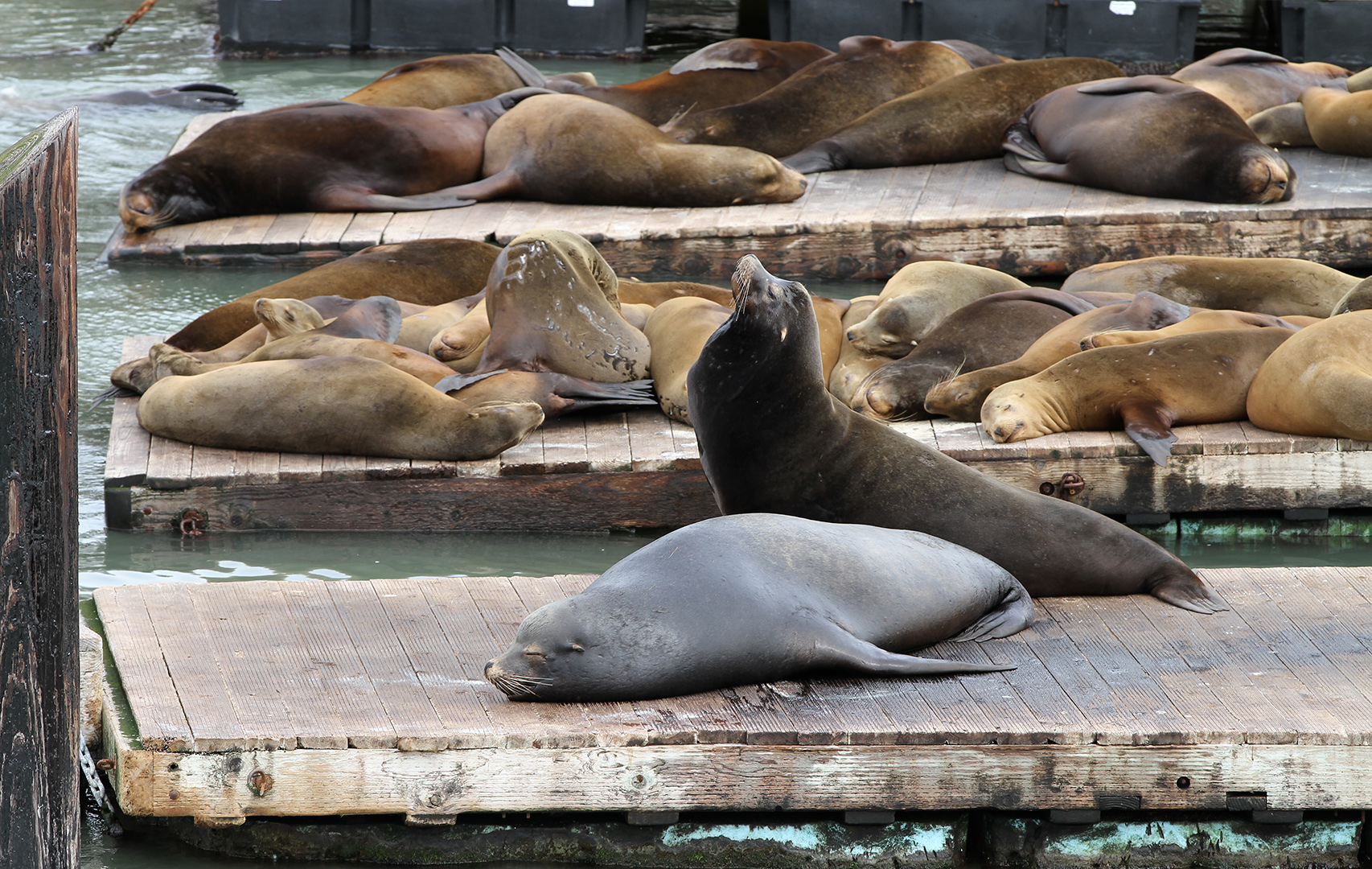
Hundreds of California sea lions bask on Pier 39 in San Francisco, where they are welcomed as a tourist attraction.

The IUCN lists the California sea lion as Least Concern due to "its large and increasing population size." The estimated population is 238,000–241,000 for the U.S. or Pacific Temperate stock, 75,000–85,000 for the Western Baja California or Pacific Tropical stock, and 31,393 for the population in the Gulf of California. Off the Pacific coast of the United States, California sea lions are so numerous that they are close to carrying capacity, while the Gulf of California population declined by 20% by 2008. California sea lions may be killed when in conflict with fishermen, by poaching, and by entanglements in human-made garbage. They are also threatened by pollutants like DDT and PCB which accumulate in the marine food chain.

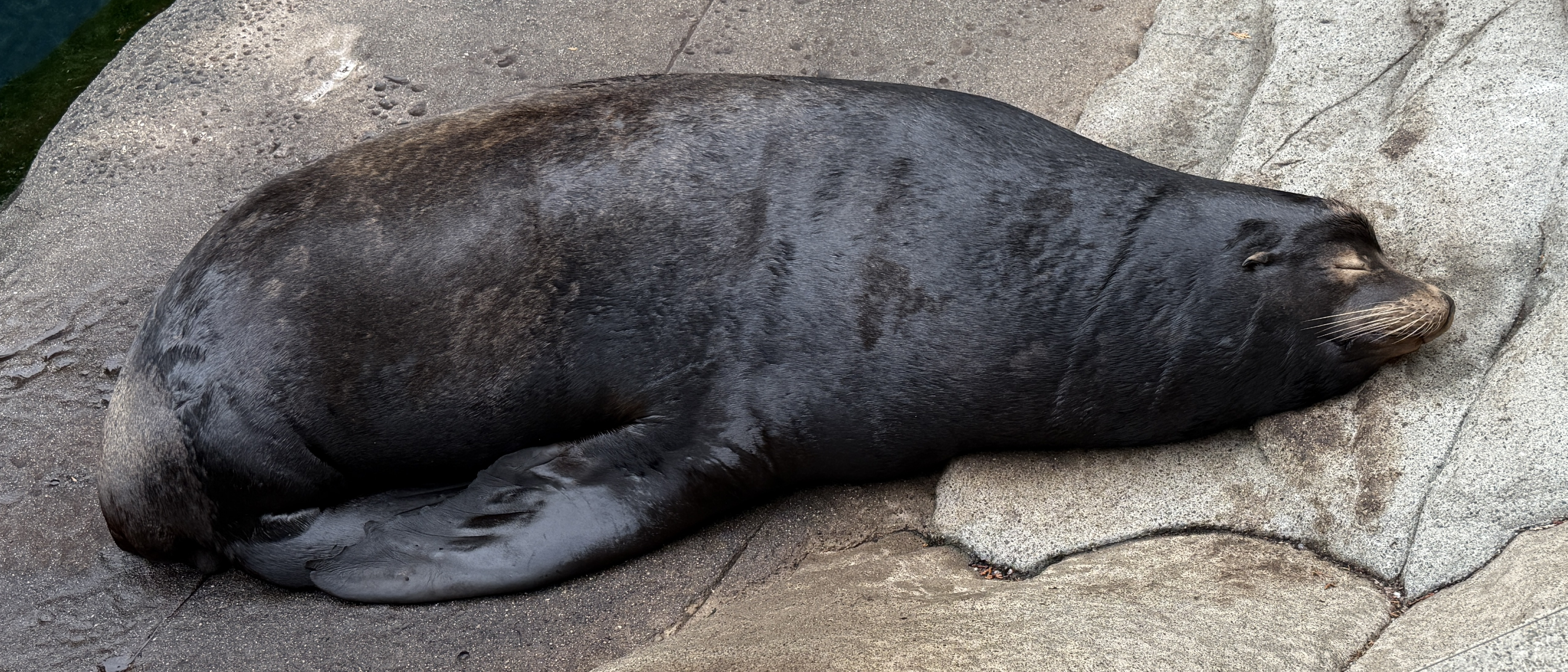
"Señor Cinco", a rescued adult male California sea lion that was blinded after being shot in the face, at the Vancouver Aquarium

In the United States, the California sea lion is protected on the federal Marine Mammal Protection Act (MMPA), passed in 1972, which outlaws hunting, killing, capture, and harassment of the animal. In 1994 an amendment to the Act allowed for the possibility of limited lethal removal of pinnipeds preying on endangered salmonids should the level of predation be documented to have a significant adverse impact on the decline or recovery of ESA-listed salmonids. Applications have been granted for removal of several individual California sea lions at Ballard Locks and at the Bonneville Dam, where up to 92 California sea lions can be killed each year for a 5-year period. Wildlife officials have unsuccessfully attempted to ward off the sea lions using bombs, rubber bullets and bean bags. Efforts to chase sea lions away from the area have also proven ineffective. Critics have objected to the killing of the California sea lions, pointing out that the level of mortality permitted as a result of recreational and commercial fisheries in the river and as part of the operation of hydroelectric dams pose a greater threat to the salmon.

These animals exploit more human-made environments like docks for haul-out sites. Many docks are not designed to withstand the weight of several resting California sea lions which cause major tilting and other problems. Wildlife managers have used various methods to control the animals and some city officials have redesigned docks so they can better withstand them.

=== 2015 Californian shore sea lions pups crisis ===
In January and February 2015, 1450 malnourished or sick California sea lion pups were found along stretches of the California coast, and estimations give a higher number of dead pups. The National Oceanic and Atmospheric Administration has pointed to unprecedentedly warm Pacific coastal waters, related to Pacific decadal oscillation and El Niño, as the likely cause. Elevated water temperatures reduced the abundance of anchovies, sardines and mackerel, principal components of the California sea lion pup diet during nursery season. This caused many California sea lion pups to starve, while others died when they took to open waters in search of food at too early an age. Several months earlier, in the summer of 2014, a large number of Cassin's auklet chicks died during the fledging period due to similar circumstances brought about by elevated water temperatures.

=== Oregon and Washington state governments annual killings ===
In November 2018, the State of Oregon obtained a permit to kill 93 California sea lions per year below Willamette Falls. Under a similar program, Oregon and Washington had killed over 150 California sea lions on the Columbia River by January 2019. In both cases, the purpose was to protect the local populations of fish (such as trout or salmon) from predation by the sea lions. In August 2020, the federal government authorized the states of Oregon, Washington, and Idaho as well as six regional tribes to cull sea lions that preyed upon endangered species of fish in the Columbia River basin, allowing for the killing of up to 540 California sea lions and 176 Steller sea lions over the following five years. Between 2020 and April 2023, Oregon killed 99 sea lions as part of this program.
