= Doryteuthis ocula =

Conservation status
- Data Deficient (IUCN 3.1)

Scientific classification
- Kingdom: Animalia
- Phylum: Mollusca
- Class: Cephalopoda
- Order: Myopsida
- Family: Loliginidae
- Genus: Doryteuthis
- Species: D. ocula

Binomial name
- Doryteuthis ocula (Cohen, 1976)

Species of squid

Doryteuthis ocula, commonly known as the bigeye inshore squid, is a species of squid in the family Loliginidae. It is also known as Loligo ocula. It is found in the Caribbean Sea, and the Western Atlantic around Cuba. It is found in depths between 250 m and 360 m from the surface.

== Anatomy ==
D. ocula has a blunt mantle, with rounded rhomboidal fins. It is a small-sized squid, with a mantle length up to 127 mm. It has robust tentacles, clubs expanded.
