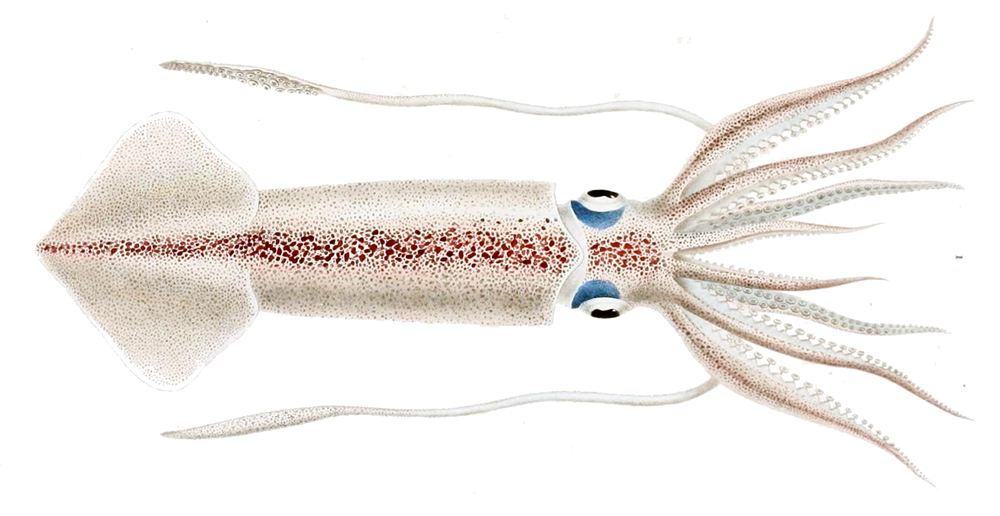
- Doryteuthis gahi

Scientific classification
- Kingdom: Animalia
- Phylum: Mollusca
- Class: Cephalopoda
- Order: Myopsida
- Family: Loliginidae
- Genus: Doryteuthis; Naef, 1912

Type species
- Loligo pleii Blainville, 1823

= Doryteuthis =

Genus of squids

Doryteuthis is a genus of squid from the waters of the western Atlantic and eastern Pacific, off the coast of the Americas. The various species are the common inshore squids of American waters. Some species are important quarry species for fisheries.

In Doryteuthis the tentacular clubs are expanded and bear suckers in 4 series. The hectocotylus is on the left ventral arm IV with unmodified suckers near the base, lack of a ventral crest while the reduced on elongated stalks form papillae on the dorsal series or on both dorsal and ventral series. The fins are situated in a posterior position. The spermatophore has a short, cement body and they do not have any photophores.

== Taxonomy ==
Doryteuthis is divided into two subgenera, Amerigo and Doryteuthis. The species in each subgenus are:

- Subgenus Amerigo
  - Doryteuthis gahi (d'Orbigny, 1835) Patagonian squid
  - Doryteuthis ocula (Cohen, 1976) bigeye inshore squid
  - Doryteuthis opalescens (Berry, 1911) opalescent inshore squid
  - Doryteuthis pealeii (Lesueur, 1821) longfin inshore squid
  - Doryteuthis surinamensis (Voss, 1974) Surinam squid
- Subgenus Doryteuthis
  - Doryteuthis plei (Blainville, 1823) slender inshore squid
  - Doryteuthis roperi (Cohen, 1976) Island inshore squid
  - Doryteuthis sanpaulensis (Brakoniecki, 1984) São Paulo squid
