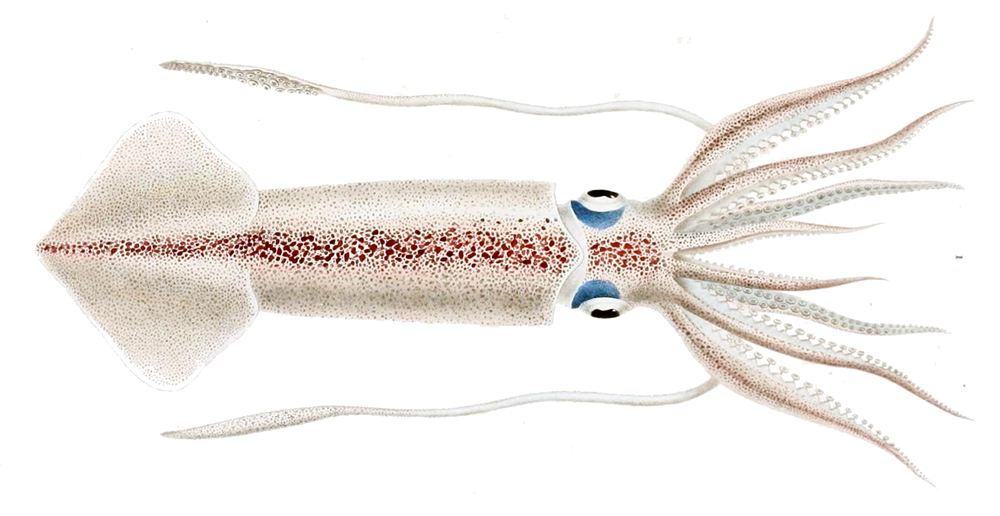

Conservation status
- Least Concern (IUCN 3.1)

Scientific classification
- Kingdom: Animalia
- Phylum: Mollusca
- Class: Cephalopoda
- Order: Myopsida
- Family: Loliginidae
- Genus: Doryteuthis
- Species: D. gahi

Binomial name
- Doryteuthis gahi (d'Orbigny, 1835)

Synonyms
- Loligo gahi d'Orbigny, 1835; Loligo patagonica Smith, 1881

= Doryteuthis gahi =

Patagonian squid

Species of squid

Doryteuthis gahi, also known as Loligo, the Patagonian longfin squid and Patagonian squid (Spanish: calamar patagónico or just calamar), is a small-sized squid belonging to the family Loliginidae. It occurs in coastal waters in the southeastern Pacific Ocean and the southwestern Atlantic Ocean where it is caught and eaten for food.

== Description ==
The Patagonian squid is a small species and has a mantle length of 10 to 15 cm (4 to 6 in) and a weight of between 75 and 150 grams (2.6 and 5.3 oz). The mantle is somewhat elongated and on either side at the posterior end are rhomboidal fins, rather less than half the length of the mantle. At the anterior end are four pairs of arms and a pair of tentacles. The third and fourth pairs of arms are longer than the others, and in males, the left fourth arm is heterodactylised near its tip. The tentacles are long and slender, each terminated by a club-shaped "manus" with small, narrow suckers at the edge and slightly larger ones at the centre.

== Distribution ==
This squid occurs in the southeastern Pacific Ocean and the southwestern Atlantic Ocean. In the Pacific, its range extends along the coast from southern Peru to southern Chile, and in the Atlantic, from the San Matías Gulf in Argentina southwards to Tierra del Fuego, including the continental shelf around the Falkland Islands. It is an open-water species with a depth range from the surface down to about 350 m (1,150 ft).

== Biology ==
Little is known of the biology of this species, but like all squid, it is a predator. Prey items are caught by the tentacles, grasped and moved to the mouth with the help of the arms, and then chewed by the horny beak. In Chile, spawning grounds have been identified at depths of between 10 and 15 m (33 and 49 ft). Fragile egg masses some 25 mm (1 in) long containing about 15 embryos have been found among stems of the kelp Lessonia trabeculata, particularly in places where the algae have been heavily defoliated, suggesting that a semi-protected environment with adequate water movement is desirable. It is often prey to Otaria flavescens, Alectis ciliaris, and other predators.

== Uses ==
In the Pacific Ocean, this species is mostly caught as bycatch during trawls directed at other species.

In the Atlantic Ocean there is a dedicated fishery in the Falkland Islands/Islas Malvinas where it is an important target species taken from over the Patagonian Shelf. The total reported world catch in 1999 was 42,505 t (41,834 long tons; 46,854 short tons), with the largest catch being from the Falkland Islands (22,502 t (22,147 long tons; 24,804 short tons)).
