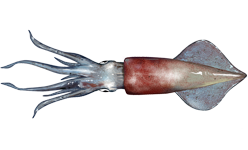

Conservation status
- Least Concern (IUCN 3.1)

Scientific classification
- Kingdom: Animalia
- Phylum: Mollusca
- Class: Cephalopoda
- Order: Myopsida
- Family: Loliginidae
- Genus: Doryteuthis
- Subgenus: Amerigo
- Species: D. pealeii

Binomial name
- Doryteuthis pealeii (Lesueur, 1821)

Synonyms
- Loligo pallida Verrill, 1873; Loligo pealeii Lesueur, 1821; Loligo punctata DeKay, 1843

= Longfin inshore squid =

Species of cephalopod

The longfin inshore squid (Doryteuthis pealeii) is a species of squid of the family Loliginidae.

== Description ==
This species of squid is often seen with a reddish hue, but like many types of squid can manipulate its color, varying from a deep red to a soft pink. The dorsal mantle length of some males can reach up to 50 cm, although most squid commercially harvested are smaller than 30 cm long. This species exhibits sexual dimorphism, with most males growing faster and reaching larger sizes than females.

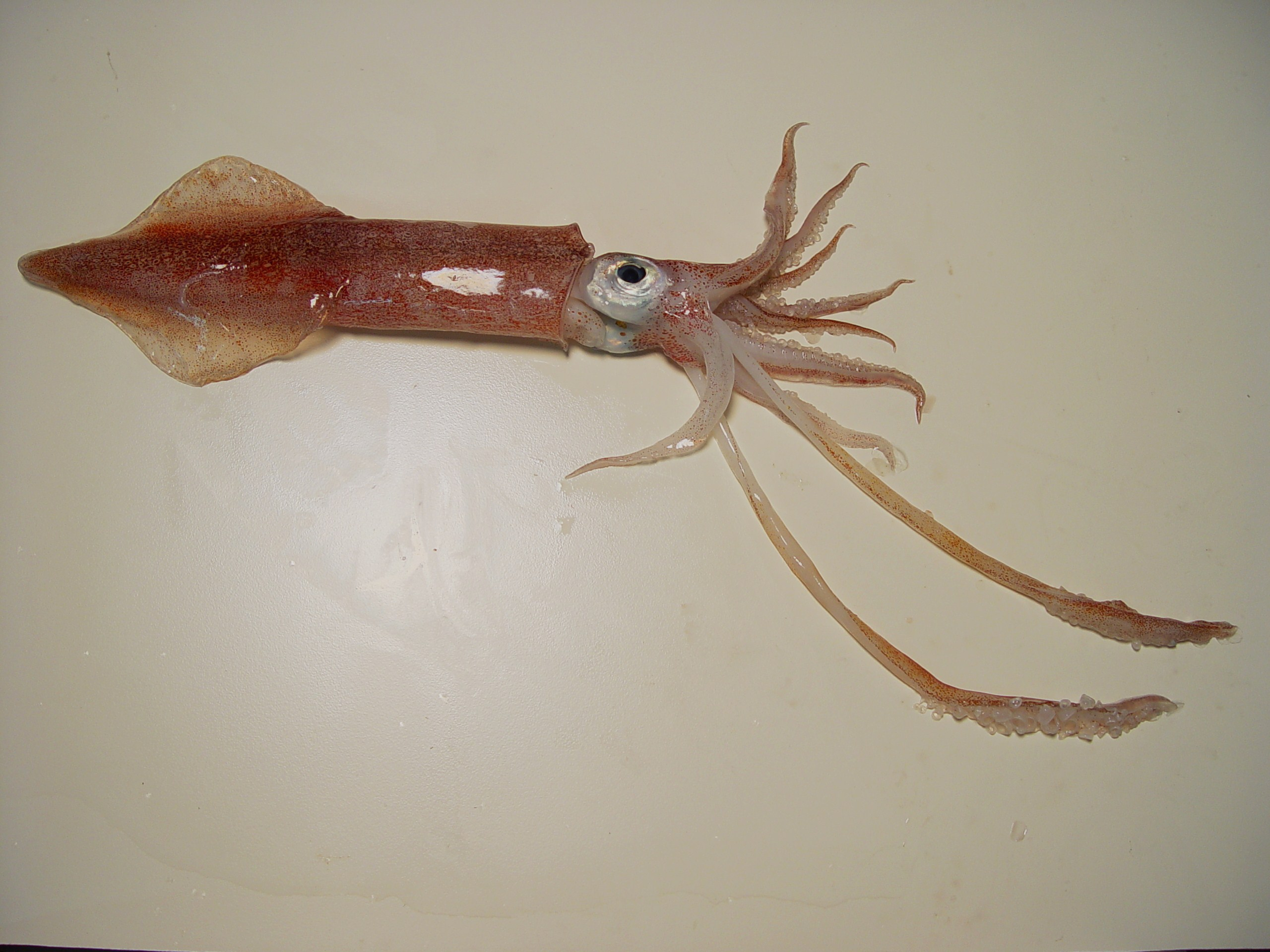
Specimen with tentacles outstretched

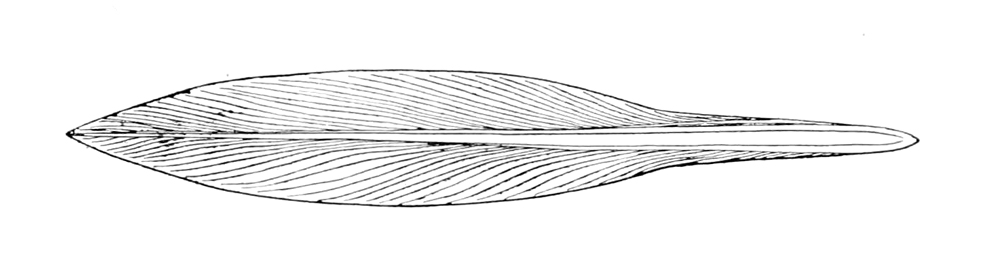
The gladius of a longfin inshore squid

== Distribution ==
The longfin inshore squid is found in the North Atlantic, schooling in continental shelf and slope waters from Newfoundland to the Gulf of Venezuela. It is commercially exploited, especially in the range from the Southern Georges Bank to Cape Hatteras. The population makes seasonal migrations that appear to be related to bottom water temperatures; they move offshore during late autumn to overwinter along the edge of the continental shelf and return inshore during the spring and early summer (MAFMC 1998).

== Diet ==
"The diet of the longfin inshore squid changes with size; small immature individuals feed on planktonic organisms while larger individuals feed on crustaceans and small fish. Studies have shown that juveniles feed on euphausiids and arrow worms, while older individuals feed mostly on small crabs, but also on polychaetes and shrimp. Adults feed on fish (clupeids, myctophids) and squid larvae/juveniles, and those larger than 16 cm feed on fish and squid. Fish species preyed on by longfin inshore squid include silver hake, mackerel, herring, menhaden, sand lance, bay anchovy, weakfish, and silversides. Maurer and Bowman (1985) discovered a difference in inshore/offshore diet: in offshore waters in the spring, the diet is composed of crustaceans (mainly euphausiids) and fish; in inshore waters in the fall, the diet is composed almost exclusively of fish; and in offshore waters in the fall, the diet is composed of fish and squid. Cannibalism is observed in individuals larger than 5 cm."

== Predators ==
Many pelagic and demersal fish species, as well as marine mammals and diving birds, prey upon juvenile and adult longfin inshore squid. Marine mammal predators include longfin pilot whales and common dolphins. Fish predators include striped bass, bluefish, sea bass, mackerel, cod, haddock, pollock, silver hake, red hake, sea raven, spiny dogfish, angel shark, goosefish, dogfish, mako shark, blue marlin and flounder. These squid do have ways of evading predators too. They have a very complex way of swimming called jet propulsion. The fin stroke plus the propulsion creates a unique way of swimming in the ocean. This can help squid get away from predators more efficiently.

== Reproduction ==
The longfin inshore squid spawns year-round and lives for less than one year. "Eggs are demersal. Enclosed in a gelatinous capsule containing up to 200 eggs. Each female lays 20-30 capsules. Fecundity ranges from 950–15,900 eggs per female. Laid in masses made up of hundreds of egg capsules from different females." Individuals hatched in summer generally grow more rapidly than those hatched in winter due to the warmer temperature of the water. The lifespan of a typical specimen is normally less than one year.

Studies of D. pealeii have shown that males employ multiple reproductive tactics—including mate guarding and sneaker strategies—at communal egg beds.

== Research ==
This species is a model organism in neuroscience and it was used by Andrew Huxley and Alan Hodgkin in their studies on axons. Its axon is the largest axon known to science. They are also used for research on replicating their camouflage abilities due to the chromatophores in their skin, which reflect a different color depending on the angle at which the light is hitting them. A dead longfin can show a colourful display with its chromatophores by connecting its axons to a music player.
