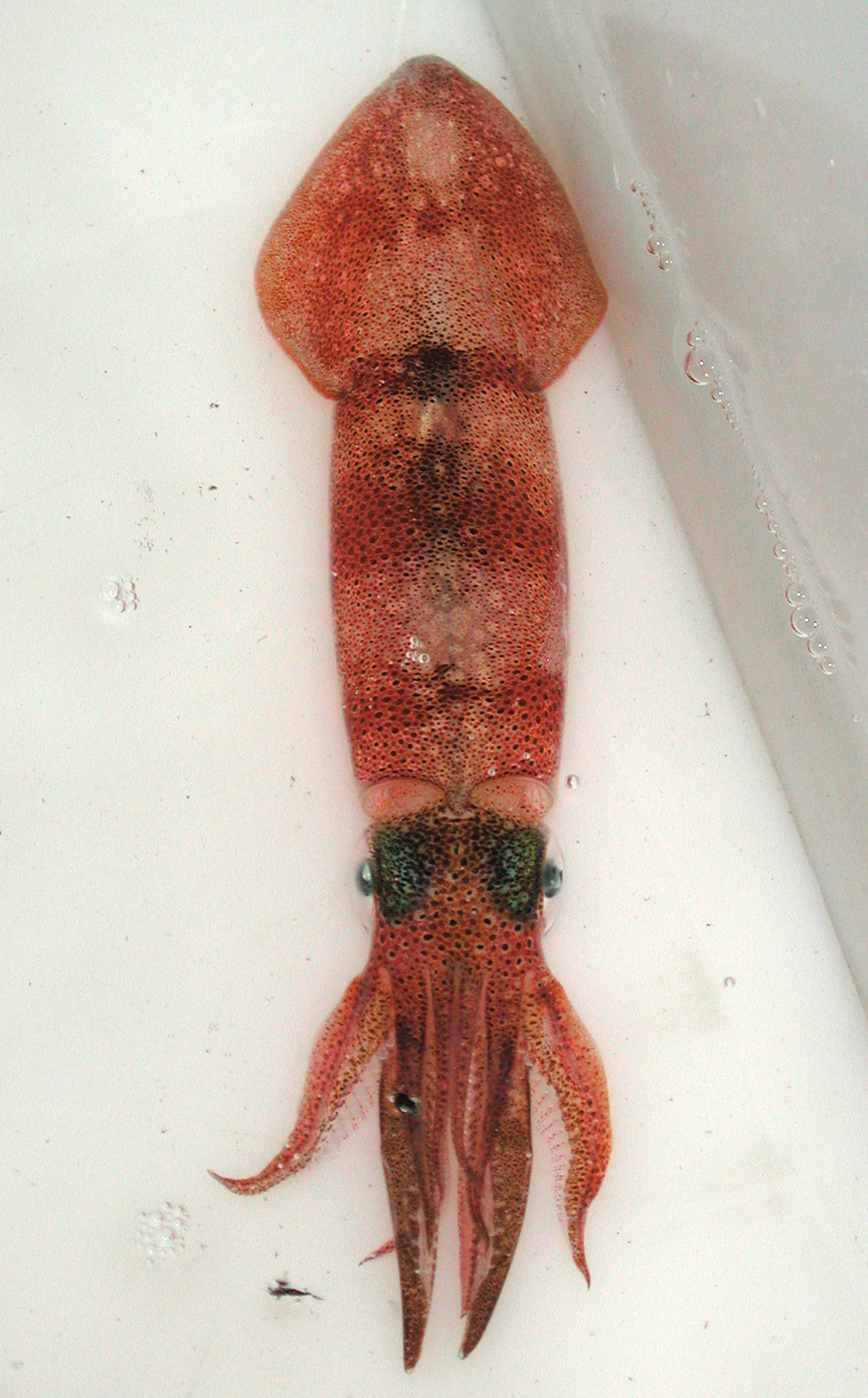

Conservation status
- Least Concern (IUCN 3.1)

Scientific classification
- Kingdom: Animalia
- Phylum: Mollusca
- Class: Cephalopoda
- Order: Myopsida
- Family: Loliginidae
- Genus: Doryteuthis
- Subgenus: Doryteuthis
- Species: D. plei

Binomial name
- Doryteuthis plei (Blainville, 1823)

Synonyms
- Loligo plei Blainville, 1823

= Doryteuthis plei =

Slender inshore squid

Species of squid

Doryteuthis plei, also known as the slender inshore squid or arrow squid, is a medium-sized squid belonging to the family Loliginidae. It occurs abundantly in coastal waters of the Atlantic Ocean, from Argentina northward to North Carolina.

== Description ==
As both common names imply, these squid have elongate, cylindrical bodies with a length to width ratio of 7:1. The arms are in contrast short and weak; the two tentacles are somewhat less than the mantle length. The rhombus-shaped fins are large, up to about 50 percent of the mantle length. Running the ventral length of the mantle is a noticeable ridge. The squid are a reddish orange colour with a large complement of chromatophores.

The suckers of the arms possess blunt teeth. On the meaty ends (clubs) of the tentacles, there are four rows of suckers; the inner two (mesial) rows are three times as large as the outer two (marginal) rows. The larger suckers have horny rings with up to 45 teeth.

These squid reach a maximum mantle length of 33 centimetres in males and 22 centimetres in females. Sexual dimorphism is apparent, with the left ventral arm in males modified into a hectocotylus; this is used to facilitate fertilization during mating. Males also have a number of purple stripes running lengthwise on the ventral side of the mantle; along with other visual cues produced by chromatophores, these stripes are used in elaborate courtship displays.

== Ecology ==
Due to their abundance, slender inshore squid are important to both commercial and subsistence fisheries. During the annual summer mating season, the squid congregate in large numbers near shore. During the austral summer in waters off Brazil, annual catches may reach 763 metric tonnes.

While there may be safety in their numbers, the squid are an important prey item for large fish such as tuna and sharks and a number of cetaceans: pygmy killer whales, orcas, Atlantic spotted dolphins, rough-toothed dolphins, and bottlenose dolphins are all known predators of slender inshore squid. Other predators include South African and Antarctic fur seals.

The squid prey upon several species of estuarine fish, including: killifish, mosquitofish and mollies. Small crustaceans such as grass shrimp are also taken.
