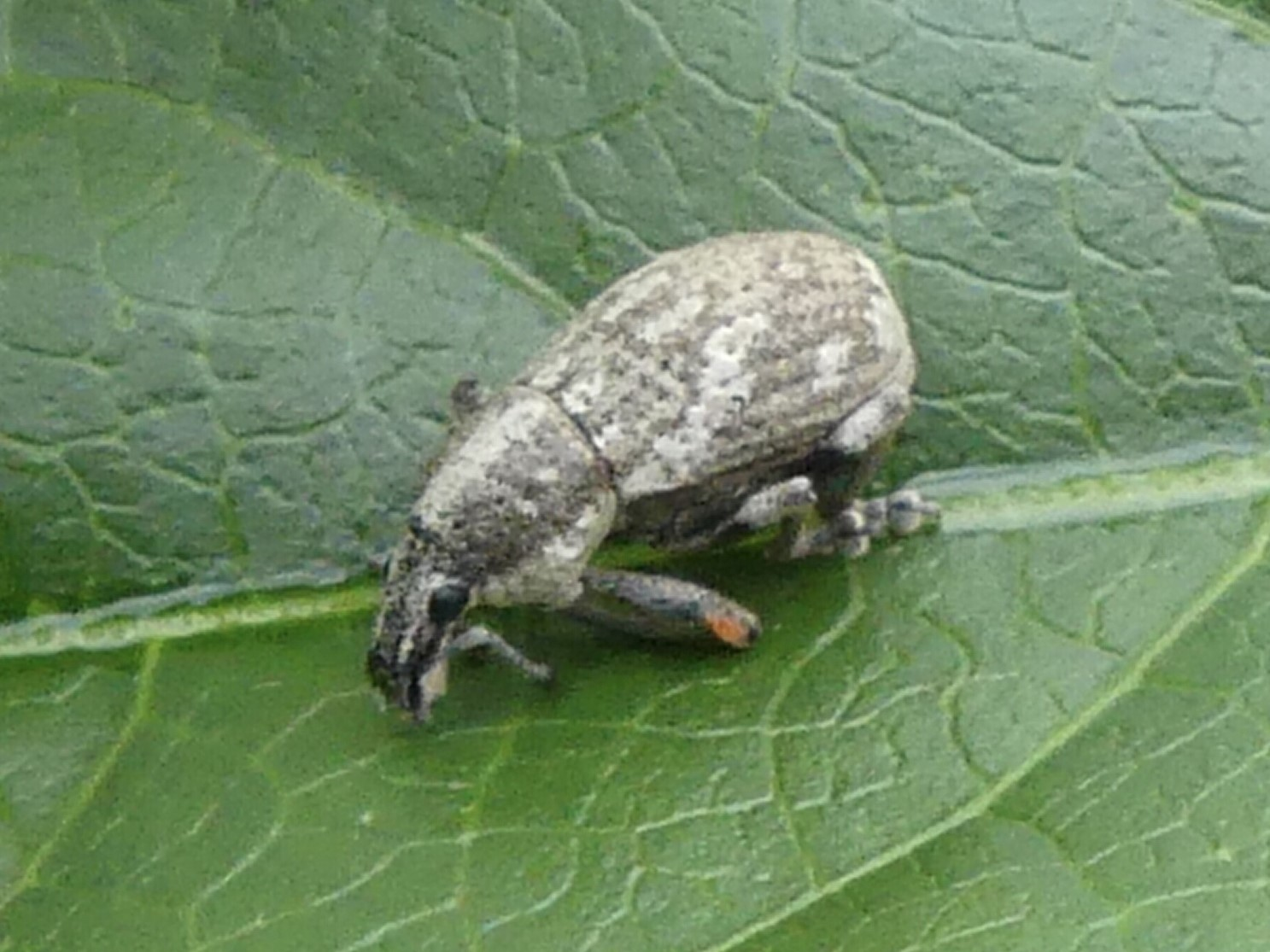

Scientific classification
- Domain: Eukaryota
- Kingdom: Animalia
- Phylum: Arthropoda
- Class: Insecta
- Order: Coleoptera
- Suborder: Polyphaga
- Infraorder: Cucujiformia
- Family: Curculionidae
- Subfamily: Entiminae
- Tribe: Geonemini
- Genus: Epicaerus
- Species: E. imbricatus

Binomial name
- Epicaerus imbricatus (Say, 1824)

= Epicaerus imbricatus =

Species of beetle

Epicaerus imbricatus, the imbricated snout beetle, is a species of broad-nosed weevil in the family Curculionidae. It is found in North America.
