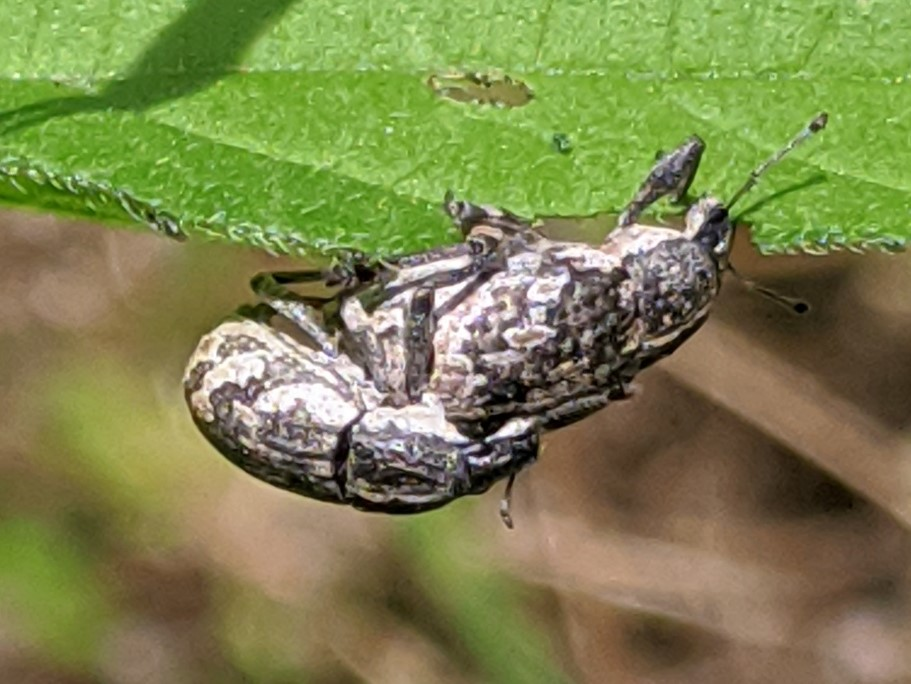

Scientific classification
- Domain: Eukaryota
- Kingdom: Animalia
- Phylum: Arthropoda
- Class: Insecta
- Order: Coleoptera
- Suborder: Polyphaga
- Infraorder: Cucujiformia
- Family: Curculionidae
- Subfamily: Entiminae
- Tribe: Geonemini
- Genus: Epicaerus
- Species: E. lepidotus

Binomial name
- Epicaerus lepidotus Pierce, 1910

= Epicaerus lepidotus =

Species of beetle

Epicaerus lepidotus is a species of broad-nosed weevil in the beetle family Curculionidae. It is found in North America.
