= Epicaerus benjamini =

Scientific classification
- Domain: Eukaryota
- Kingdom: Animalia
- Phylum: Arthropoda
- Class: Insecta
- Order: Coleoptera
- Suborder: Polyphaga
- Infraorder: Cucujiformia
- Family: Curculionidae
- Subfamily: Entiminae
- Tribe: Geonemini
- Genus: Epicaerus
- Species: E. benjamini

Binomial name
- Epicaerus benjamini Pierce, 1913

Species of beetle

Epicaerus benjamini is a species of broad-nosed weevil in the beetle family Curculionidae. It is found in North America.
