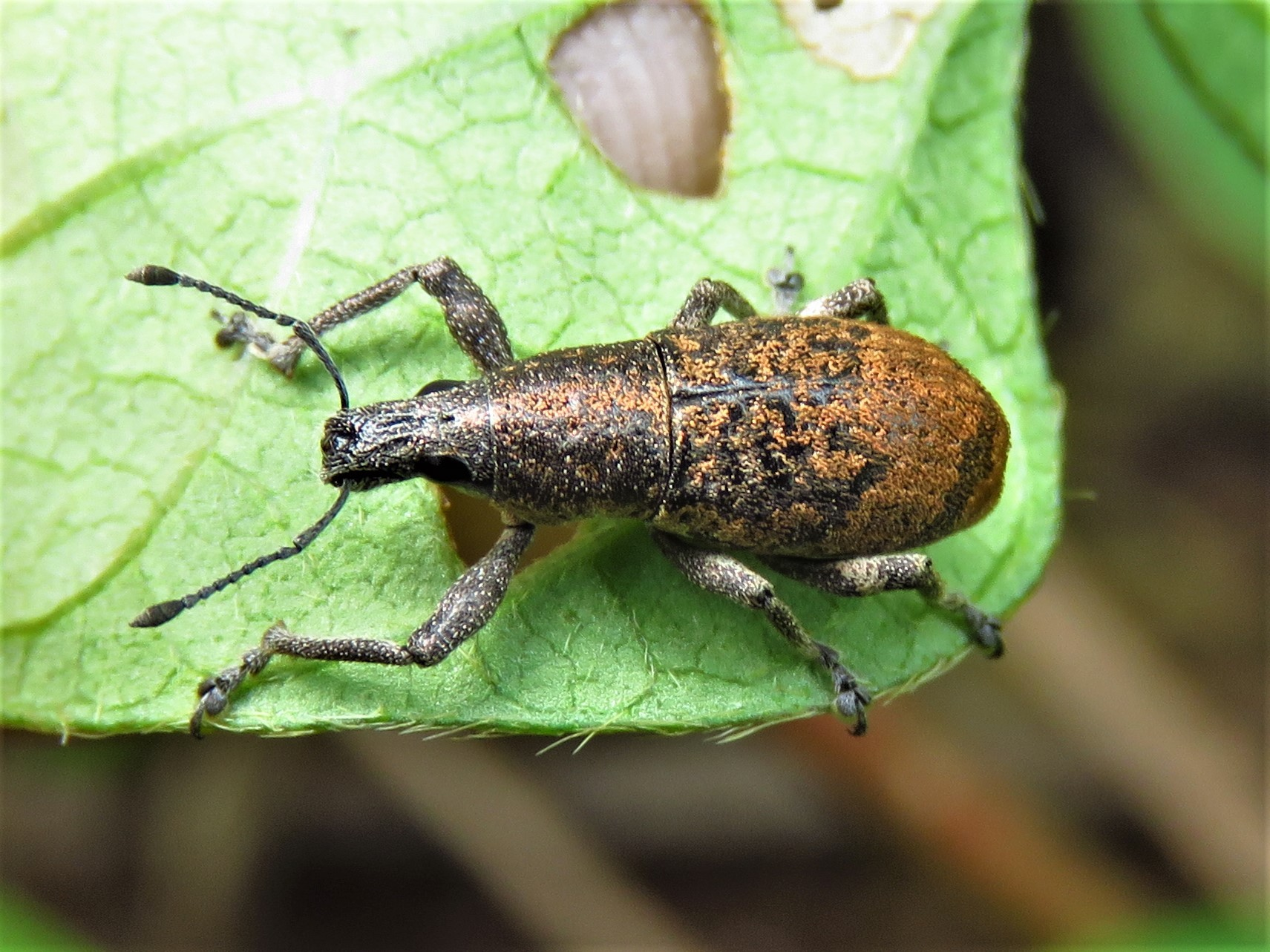

Scientific classification
- Kingdom: Animalia
- Phylum: Arthropoda
- Class: Insecta
- Order: Coleoptera
- Suborder: Polyphaga
- Infraorder: Cucujiformia
- Family: Curculionidae
- Subfamily: Entiminae
- Tribe: Geonemini
- Genus: Epicaerus
- Species: E. mexicanus

Binomial name
- Epicaerus mexicanus Boheman, 1834

Synonyms
- Epicaerus aeruginosus Boheman, 1842; Epicaerus cyphus Boheman, 1842; Epicaerus transversepunctatus Boheman, 1842

= Epicaerus mexicanus =

Species of beetle

Epicaerus mexicanus, known generally as the brown leaf notcher or Mexican root weevil, is a species of broad-nosed weevil in the beetle family Curculionidae. It is found in North America.
