= Epicaerus sulcatus =

Scientific classification
- Kingdom: Animalia
- Phylum: Arthropoda
- Class: Insecta
- Order: Coleoptera
- Suborder: Polyphaga
- Infraorder: Cucujiformia
- Family: Curculionidae
- Subfamily: Entiminae
- Tribe: Geonemini
- Genus: Epicaerus
- Species: E. sulcatus

Binomial name
- Epicaerus sulcatus Casey, 1888

Species of beetle

Epicaerus sulcatus is a species of broad-nosed weevil in the beetle family Curculionidae.
