= Trigonoscuta stantoni =

Scientific classification
- Domain: Eukaryota
- Kingdom: Animalia
- Phylum: Arthropoda
- Class: Insecta
- Order: Coleoptera
- Suborder: Polyphaga
- Infraorder: Cucujiformia
- Family: Curculionidae
- Genus: Trigonoscuta
- Species: T. stantoni

Binomial name
- Trigonoscuta stantoni Sleeper, 1975

Species of beetle

Trigonoscuta stantoni, known generally as the Stanton's trigonoscuta weevil or Santa Cruz island shore weevil, is a species of broad-nosed weevil in the beetle family Curculionidae. It is found in North America.
