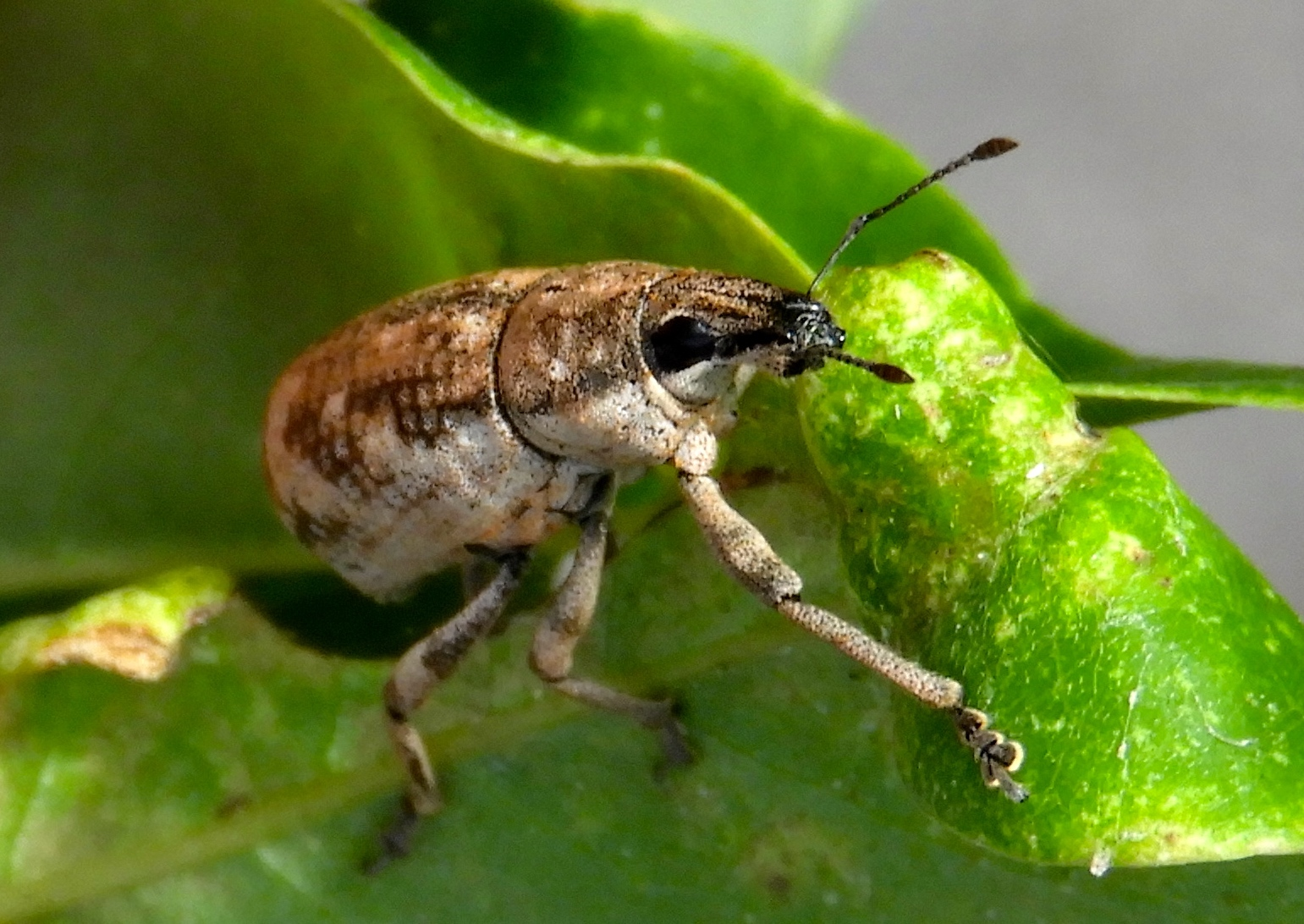
- Epicaerus, México

Scientific classification
- Kingdom: Animalia
- Phylum: Arthropoda
- Class: Insecta
- Order: Coleoptera
- Suborder: Polyphaga
- Infraorder: Cucujiformia
- Family: Curculionidae
- Subfamily: Entiminae
- Tribe: Geonemini
- Genus: Epicaerus; Schönherr, 1834

Synonyms
- Diorynotus Sharp, 1891; Epagrius Sharp, 1891; Epiacaerus Horn, 1894; Epicoerus Champion, 1912

= Epicaerus =

Genus of beetles

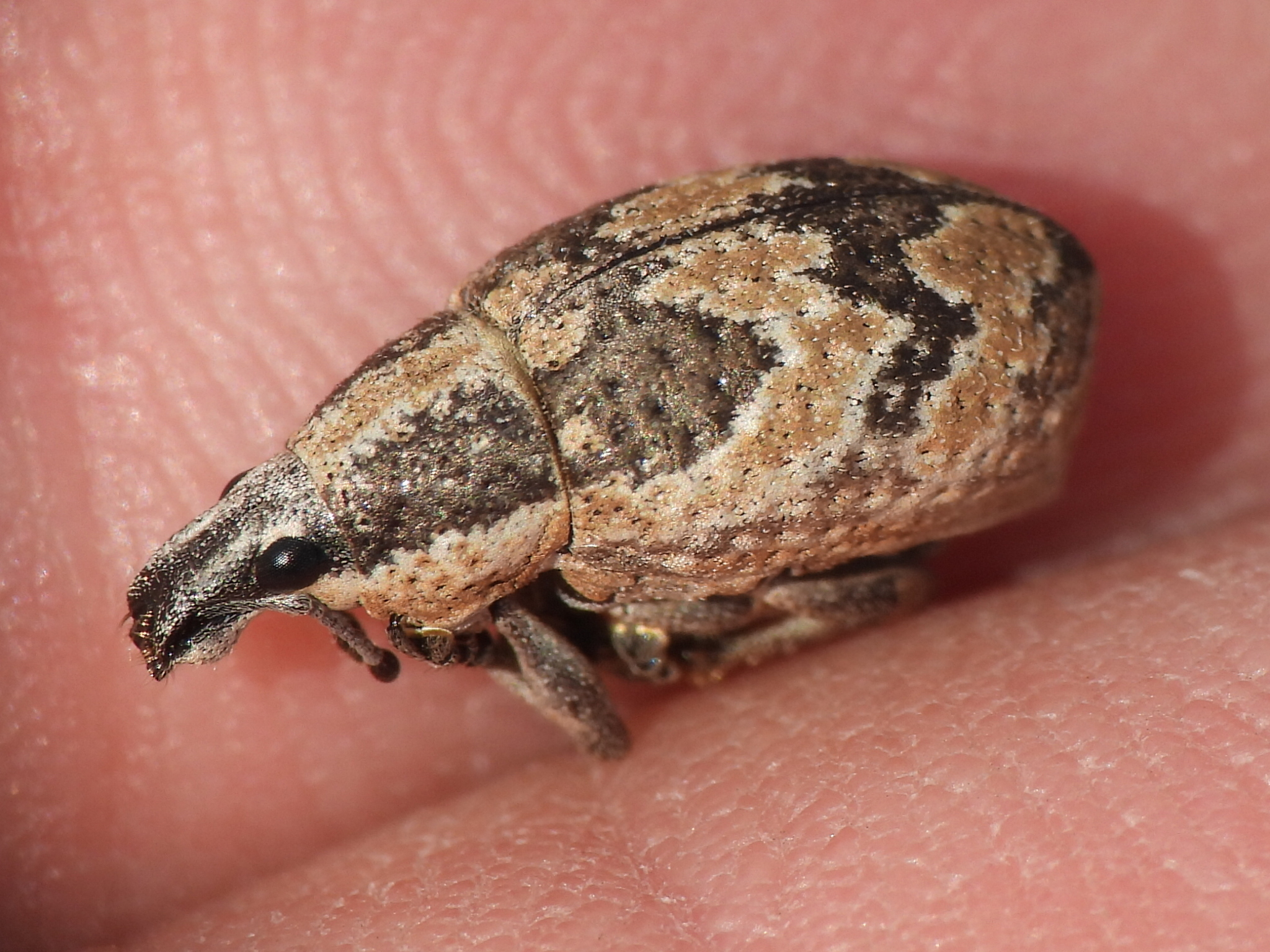
Epicaerus imbricatus, Texas

Epicaerus is a genus of broad-nosed weevils in the beetle family Curculionidae. There are more than 90 described species in Epicaerus, found in North America and Central America.

== Species ==
These 91 species belong to the genus Epicaerus:

- Epicaerus aequalis Sharp, 1891
- Epicaerus albosquamosus (Chevrolat, 1880)
- Epicaerus amulae Sharp, 1891
- Epicaerus aurifer Boheman, 1842
- Epicaerus benjamini Pierce, 1913
- Epicaerus bicolor Sharp, 1891
- Epicaerus biformis Sharp, 1891
- Epicaerus brevirostris (Sharp, 1891)
- Epicaerus calvus Sharp, 1891
- Epicaerus capetillensis Sharp, 1891
- Epicaerus carinatus Boheman, 1842
- Epicaerus carteri Chevrolat, 1880
- Epicaerus centralis Sharp, 1891
- Epicaerus championi Sharp, 1891
- Epicaerus cognatus Sharp, 1891
- Epicaerus concolor Sharp, 1891
- Epicaerus constans (Sharp, 1891)
- Epicaerus convexus Boheman, 1842
- Epicaerus costatus Sharp, 1891
- Epicaerus costicollis Sharp, 1891
- Epicaerus coxalis Sharp, 1891
- Epicaerus cultripennis Boheman, 1842
- Epicaerus curvipes (Sharp, 1891)
- Epicaerus decoratus Sharp, 1891
- Epicaerus depilis Boheman, 1842
- Epicaerus durangoensis Sharp, 1891
- Epicaerus elegantulus Champion, 1911
- Epicaerus fallax Boheman, 1842
- Epicaerus formidolosus Boheman, 1842
- Epicaerus foveicollis (Sharp, 1891)
- Epicaerus foveifrons Champion, 1911
- Epicaerus fronterae Sharp, 1891
- Epicaerus godmani Sharp, 1891
- Epicaerus grandis (Sharp, 1891)
- Epicaerus griseus Boheman, 1842
- Epicaerus hispidus (Sharp, 1891)
- Epicaerus hoegei Sharp, 1891
- Epicaerus hystriculus (Sharp, 1891)
- Epicaerus imbricatus (Say, 1824)
- Epicaerus impar Sharp, 1891
- Epicaerus inaequalis (Sharp, 1891)
- Epicaerus inflatus Sharp, 1891
- Epicaerus jugicola (Sharp, 1891)
- Epicaerus laevinasus (Sharp, 1891)
- Epicaerus lasalanus Tanner, 1934
- Epicaerus lateralis Sharp, 1891
- Epicaerus lepidotus Pierce, 1910
- Epicaerus lucanus Horn, 1894
- Epicaerus macropterus Sharp, 1911
- Epicaerus macropus Champion, 1911
- Epicaerus marginatus Sharp, 1891
- Epicaerus mexicanus Boheman, 1834
- Epicaerus minor Sharp, 1891
- Epicaerus monclovae Sharp, 1891
- Epicaerus nebulosus Boheman, 1834
- Epicaerus niger Sharp, 1891
- Epicaerus nubilosus (Boheman, 1840)
- Epicaerus oculatus (Sharp, 1891)
- Epicaerus opacus Sharp, 1891
- Epicaerus operculatus (Say, 1831)
- Epicaerus oscillator Sharp, 1891
- Epicaerus panamensis Girón & de Medeiros, 2022
- Epicaerus paradae (Sharp, 1891)
- Epicaerus pavidus Sharp, 1891
- Epicaerus pedestris Sharp, 1891
- Epicaerus planirostris Sharp, 1891
- Epicaerus praeteritus (Sharp, 1891)
- Epicaerus pumilus (Sharp, 1891)
- Epicaerus pyrformis Sharp, 1891
- Epicaerus retrorsus (Champion, 1911)
- Epicaerus reversus Sharp, 1891
- Epicaerus salvadorensis Kuschel, 1956
- Epicaerus samon (Sharp, 1891)
- Epicaerus scapalis (Casey, 1895)
- Epicaerus scutellaris Sharp, 1891
- Epicaerus sexcostatus Sharp, 1891
- Epicaerus simplex (Sharp, 1891)
- Epicaerus smithi (Sharp, 1891)
- Epicaerus squalidus Sharp, 1891
- Epicaerus squamosus Sharp, 1891
- Epicaerus sturmi Sharp, 1891
- Epicaerus sulcatus Casey, 1888
- Epicaerus sulcirostris Sharp, 1891
- Epicaerus tenuis Sharp, 1891
- Epicaerus texanus Casey, 1888
- Epicaerus tristis (Chevrolat, 1880)
- Epicaerus truquianus Champion, 1911
- Epicaerus uniformus Tanner, 1934
- Epicaerus variolosus (Sharp, 1891)
- Epicaerus vilis Sharp, 1891
- Epicaerus wickhami Pierce, 1913
