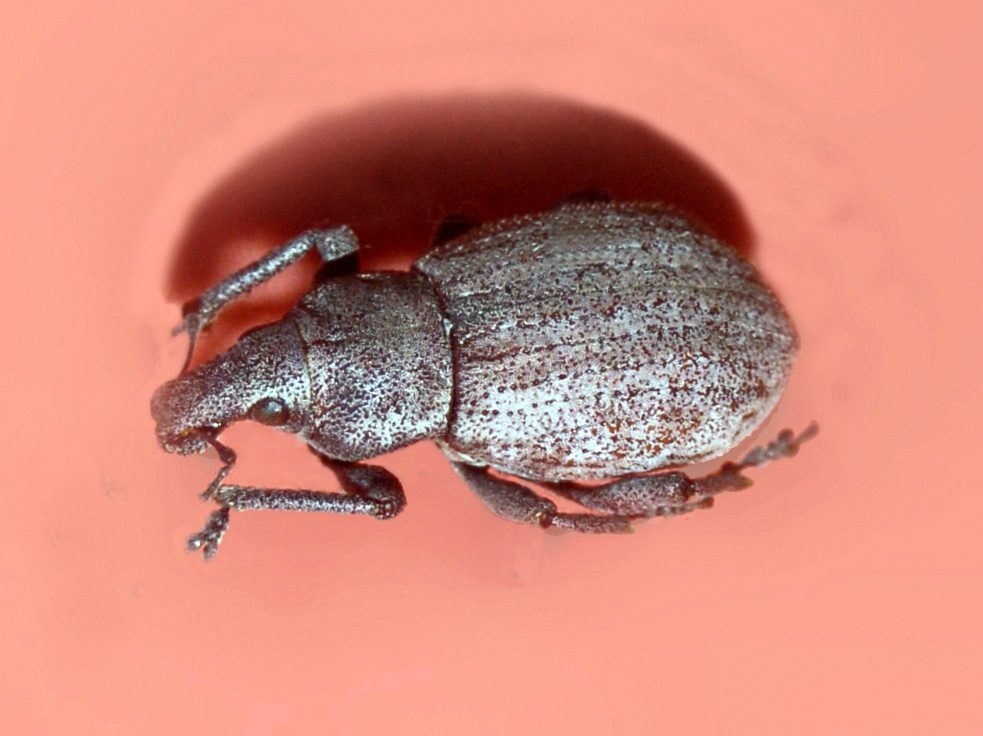
- Museum specimen of Barynotus margaritaceus

Scientific classification
- Kingdom: Animalia
- Phylum: Arthropoda
- Class: Insecta
- Order: Coleoptera
- Suborder: Polyphaga
- Infraorder: Cucujiformia
- Family: Curculionidae
- Genus: Barynotus
- Species: B. margaritaceus

Binomial name
- Barynotus margaritaceus Germar, 1824

= Barynotus margaritaceus =

Species of beetle

Barynotus margaritaceus is a species in the weevil family (Curculionidae). This species is present in the mountains of Austria, France, Italy and Switzerland.
