= Trigonoscuta cruzi =

Scientific classification
- Domain: Eukaryota
- Kingdom: Animalia
- Phylum: Arthropoda
- Class: Insecta
- Order: Coleoptera
- Suborder: Polyphaga
- Infraorder: Cucujiformia
- Family: Curculionidae
- Genus: Trigonoscuta
- Species: T. cruzi

Binomial name
- Trigonoscuta cruzi Pierce, 1975

Synonyms
- Trigonoscuta marinae Pierce, 1975; Trigonoscuta minor Pierce, 1975; Trigonoscuta mossi Pierce, 1975; Trigonoscuta ordi Pierce, 1975; Trigonoscuta vonbloekeri Pierce, 1975

Species of beetle

Trigonoscuta cruzi is a species of broad-nosed weevil in the beetle family Curculionidae. It is found in North America.

== Subspecies ==
These six subspecies belong to the species Trigonoscuta cruzi:

- Trigonoscuta cruzi cruzi^{g}
- Trigonoscuta cruzi marinae Pierce, 1975^{c g}
- Trigonoscuta cruzi minor Pierce, 1975^{c g}
- Trigonoscuta cruzi mossi Pierce, 1975^{c g}
- Trigonoscuta cruzi ordi Pierce, 1975^{c g}
- Trigonoscuta cruzi vonbloekeri Pierce, 1975^{c g}

Data sources: i = ITIS, c = Catalogue of Life, g = GBIF, b = Bugguide.net
