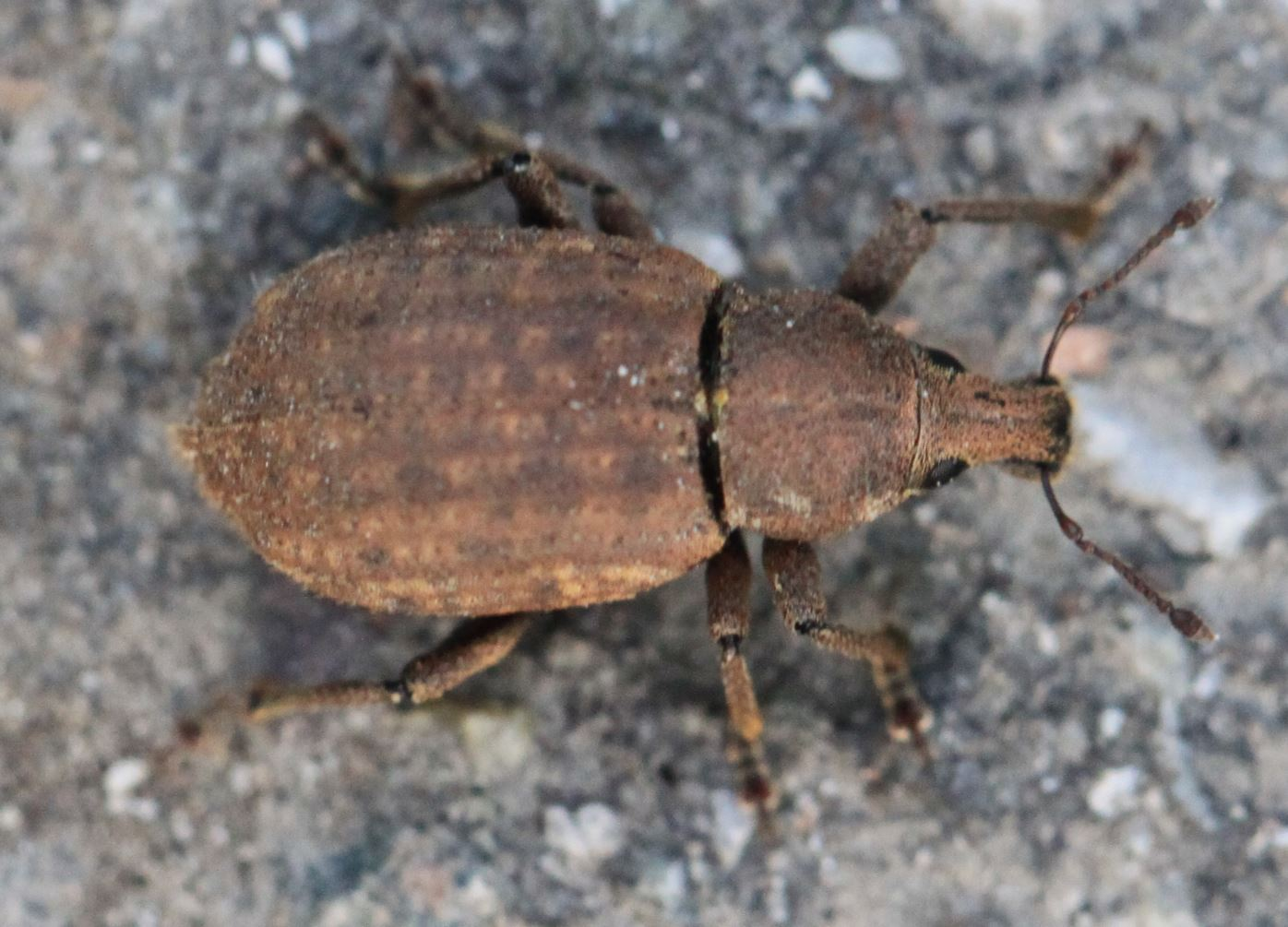

Scientific classification
- Kingdom: Animalia
- Phylum: Arthropoda
- Clade: Pancrustacea
- Class: Insecta
- Order: Coleoptera
- Suborder: Polyphaga
- Infraorder: Cucujiformia
- Superfamily: Curculionoidea
- Family: Curculionidae
- Genus: Barynotus
- Species: B. moerens

Binomial name
- Barynotus moerens (Fabricius, 1792)

= Barynotus moerens =

Species of beetle

Barynotus moerens is a species of broad-nosed weevil in the beetle family Curculionidae. It is found in North America.

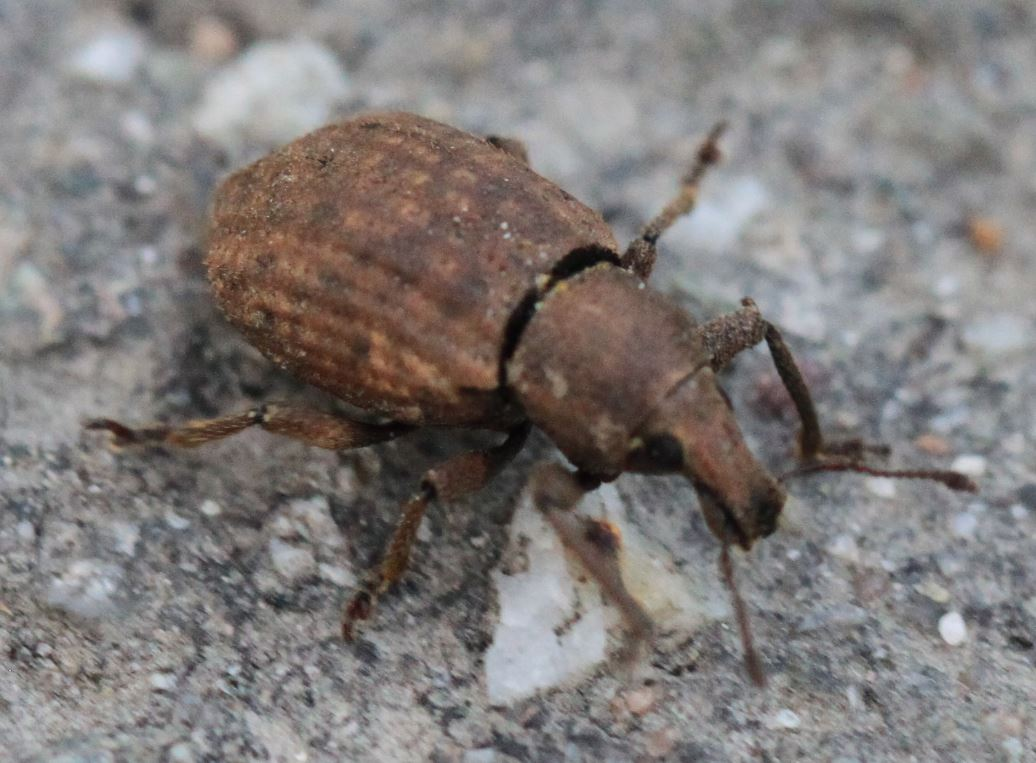
