= Stamoderes =

Scientific classification
- Kingdom: Animalia
- Phylum: Arthropoda
- Class: Insecta
- Order: Coleoptera
- Suborder: Polyphaga
- Infraorder: Cucujiformia
- Family: Curculionidae
- Tribe: Geonemini
- Genus: Stamoderes; Casey, 1888

Genus of beetles

Stamoderes is a genus of broad-nosed weevils in the beetle family Curculionidae. There are at least two described species in Stamoderes.

== Species ==
These two species belong to the genus Stamoderes:

- Stamoderes lanei (Van Dyke, 1936)^{i c g}
- Stamoderes uniformis Casey, 1888^{i c g b}

Data sources: i = ITIS, c = Catalogue of Life, g = GBIF, b = Bugguide.net
