= Trigonoscuta miguelensis =

Scientific classification
- Domain: Eukaryota
- Kingdom: Animalia
- Phylum: Arthropoda
- Class: Insecta
- Order: Coleoptera
- Suborder: Polyphaga
- Infraorder: Cucujiformia
- Family: Curculionidae
- Genus: Trigonoscuta
- Species: T. miguelensis

Binomial name
- Trigonoscuta miguelensis Pierce, 1975

Species of beetle

Trigonoscuta miguelensis is a species of broad-nosed weevil in the beetle family Curculionidae. It is found in North America.
