= Bradyrhynchoides constrictus =

Scientific classification
- Domain: Eukaryota
- Kingdom: Animalia
- Phylum: Arthropoda
- Class: Insecta
- Order: Coleoptera
- Suborder: Polyphaga
- Infraorder: Cucujiformia
- Family: Curculionidae
- Genus: Bradyrhynchoides
- Species: B. constrictus

Binomial name
- Bradyrhynchoides constrictus Pierce, 1913

Species of beetle

Bradyrhynchoides constrictus is a species of broad-nosed weevil in the beetle family Curculionidae. It is found in North America.
