= Cryptolepidus =

Scientific classification
- Domain: Eukaryota
- Kingdom: Animalia
- Phylum: Arthropoda
- Class: Insecta
- Order: Coleoptera
- Suborder: Polyphaga
- Infraorder: Cucujiformia
- Family: Curculionidae
- Tribe: Geonemini
- Genus: Cryptolepidus; Van Dyke, 1936

Genus of beetles

Cryptolepidus is a genus of broad-nosed weevils in the beetle family Curculionidae. There are about eight described species in Cryptolepidus.

== Species ==
These eight species belong to the genus Cryptolepidus:

- Cryptolepidus aridus Tanner, 1966^{i c g}
- Cryptolepidus boulderensis (Tanner, 1950)^{i c g}
- Cryptolepidus cazieri (Van Dyke, 1936)^{i c g}
- Cryptolepidus leechi Ting, 1940^{i c g b}
- Cryptolepidus nevadicus (Van Dyke, 1936)^{i c g}
- Cryptolepidus parvulus Van Dyke, 1936^{c g}
- Cryptolepidus planifrons Ting, 1940^{i c g}
- Cryptolepidus rugicollis Ting, 1940^{i c g}

Data sources: i = ITIS, c = Catalogue of Life, g = GBIF, b = Bugguide.net
