= Calyptillus =

Scientific classification
- Domain: Eukaryota
- Kingdom: Animalia
- Phylum: Arthropoda
- Class: Insecta
- Order: Coleoptera
- Suborder: Polyphaga
- Infraorder: Cucujiformia
- Family: Curculionidae
- Tribe: Geonemini
- Genus: Calyptillus; Horn, 1876

Genus of beetles

Calyptillus is a genus of broad-nosed weevils in the beetle family Curculionidae. There is at least one described species in Calyptillus, C. cryptops.
