= Trigonoscuta =

Scientific classification
- Kingdom: Animalia
- Phylum: Arthropoda
- Class: Insecta
- Order: Coleoptera
- Suborder: Polyphaga
- Infraorder: Cucujiformia
- Family: Curculionidae
- Subfamily: Entiminae
- Tribe: Geonemini
- Genus: Trigonoscuta; Motschulsky, 1853

Genus of beetles

Trigonoscuta is a genus of broad-nosed weevils in the family of beetles known as Curculionidae. There are at least 60 described species in Trigonoscuta.

== Species ==
These 67 species belong to the genus Trigonoscuta:

- Trigonoscuta anacapensis Pierce, 1975^{i c g}
- Trigonoscuta arenicola Pierce, 1975^{i c g}
- Trigonoscuta baileyae Pierce, 1975^{i c g}
- Trigonoscuta blaisdelli Pierce, 1975^{i c g}
- Trigonoscuta brunneotesselata Pierce, 1975^{i c g}
- Trigonoscuta carneyi Pierce, 1975^{i c g}
- Trigonoscuta catalina Pierce, 1975^{i c g}
- Trigonoscuta clemente Pierce, 1975^{i c g}
- Trigonoscuta coxcombi Pierce, 1975^{i c g}
- Trigonoscuta cronise Pierce, 1975^{i c g}
- Trigonoscuta cruzi Pierce, 1975^{i c g b}
- Trigonoscuta curviscroba Pierce, 1975^{i g}
- Trigonoscuta dalei Pierce, 1975^{i c g}
- Trigonoscuta deserti Pierce, 1975^{i c g}
- Trigonoscuta dorothea Pierce, 1975^{i c g}
- Trigonoscuta franciscana Pierce, 1975^{i c g}
- Trigonoscuta gualalae Pierce, 1975^{i c g}
- Trigonoscuta hendryi Pierce, 1975^{i c g}
- Trigonoscuta hilariae Pierce, 1975^{i c g}
- Trigonoscuta holtvillei Pierce, 1975^{i c g}
- Trigonoscuta hopkinsi Pierce, 1975^{i c g}
- Trigonoscuta horni Pierce, 1975^{i c g}
- Trigonoscuta imbricata Van Dyke, 1936^{i c g}
- Trigonoscuta kanakoffi Pierce, 1975^{i c g}
- Trigonoscuta kelsoensis Pierce, 1975^{i c g}
- Trigonoscuta masoni Pierce, 1975^{i c g}
- Trigonoscuta miguelensis Pierce, 1975^{i c g b}
- Trigonoscuta mohawki Pierce, 1975^{i c g b}
- Trigonoscuta montereyensis Pierce, 1975^{i c g}
- Trigonoscuta morroensis Pierce, 1975^{i c g}
- Trigonoscuta muguensis Pierce, 1975^{i c g}
- Trigonoscuta nesiotis Pierce, 1975^{i c g}
- Trigonoscuta nicolana Pierce, 1975^{i c g}
- Trigonoscuta nigromaculata Pierce, 1975^{i c g}
- Trigonoscuta oxnardi Pierce, 1975^{i c g}
- Trigonoscuta paleni Pierce, 1975^{i c g}
- Trigonoscuta paloverdensis Pierce, 1975^{i c g}
- Trigonoscuta parkeri Pierce, 1975^{i c g}
- Trigonoscuta pilosa Motschulsky, 1853^{i c g}
- Trigonoscuta pismoensis Pierce, 1975^{i c g}
- Trigonoscuta pseudopilosa Pierce, 1975^{i c g}
- Trigonoscuta pusilla Pierce, 1975^{i c g}
- Trigonoscuta pusilloides Pierce, 1975^{i c g}
- Trigonoscuta reyesiana Pierce, 1975^{i c g}
- Trigonoscuta rossi Pierce, 1975^{i c g}
- Trigonoscuta rothi Pierce, 1975^{i c g}
- Trigonoscuta rozeni Pierce, 1975^{i c g}
- Trigonoscuta sanclementis Pierce, 1975^{i c g}
- Trigonoscuta sanctabarbarae Pierce, 1975^{i c g}
- Trigonoscuta sanctarosae Pierce, 1975^{i c g}
- Trigonoscuta sandieginis Pierce, 1975^{i c g}
- Trigonoscuta sanluisi Pierce, 1975^{i c g}
- Trigonoscuta setosa (Casey, 1888)^{c g}
- Trigonoscuta setosus (Casey, 1888)^{i}
- Trigonoscuta sleeperi Pierce, 1975^{i c g}
- Trigonoscuta somertoni Pierce, 1975^{i c g}
- Trigonoscuta sonoma Pierce, 1975^{i c g}
- Trigonoscuta stantoni Sleeper, 1975^{i c g b} (Stanton's trigonoscuta weevil)
- Trigonoscuta tesselata Pierce, 1975^{i}
- Trigonoscuta tessellata Pierce, 1975^{c g}
- Trigonoscuta tinkhami Pierce, 1975^{i c g}
- Trigonoscuta variabilis Pierce, 1975^{i c g}
- Trigonoscuta viridata Pierce, 1975^{i c g}
- Trigonoscuta viridicans Pierce, 1975^{i c g}
- Trigonoscuta yermoensis Pierce, 1975^{i c g}
- Trigonoscuta yorbalindae Pierce, 1975^{i c g}
- Trigonoscuta yumaensis Pierce, 1975^{i c g}

Data sources: i = ITIS, c = Catalogue of Life, g = GBIF, b = Bugguide.net
