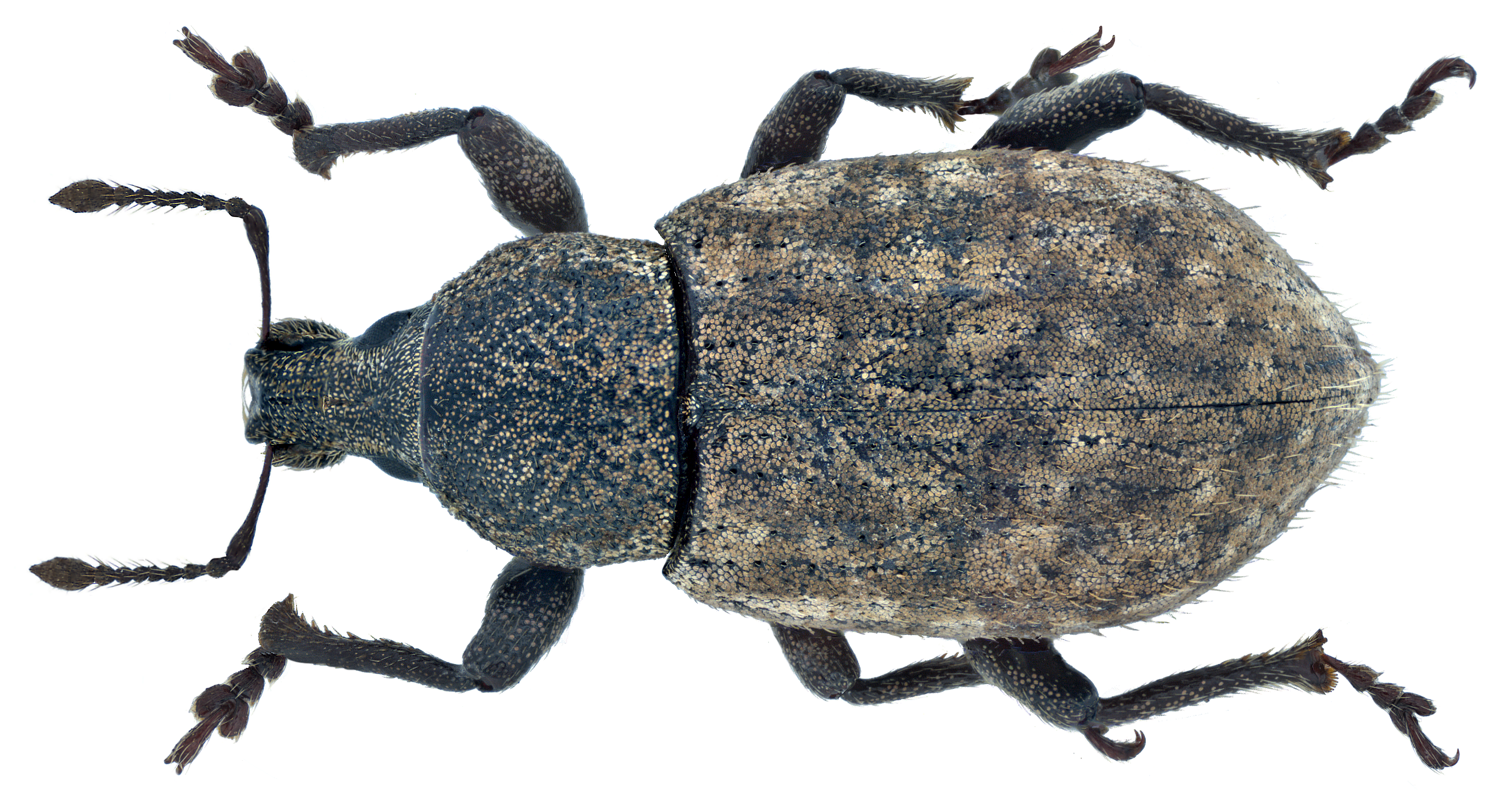

Scientific classification
- Kingdom: Animalia
- Phylum: Arthropoda
- Class: Insecta
- Order: Coleoptera
- Suborder: Polyphaga
- Infraorder: Cucujiformia
- Family: Curculionidae
- Genus: Barynotus
- Species: B. obscurus

Binomial name
- Barynotus obscurus (Fabricius, 1775)

= Barynotus obscurus =

Species of beetle

Barynotus obscurus is a species of weevil native to Europe.
