= Bradyrhynchoides =

Scientific classification
- Domain: Eukaryota
- Kingdom: Animalia
- Phylum: Arthropoda
- Class: Insecta
- Order: Coleoptera
- Suborder: Polyphaga
- Infraorder: Cucujiformia
- Family: Curculionidae
- Tribe: Geonemini
- Genus: Bradyrhynchoides; Pierce, 1913

Genus of beetles

Bradyrhynchoides is a genus of broad-nosed weevils in the beetle family Curculionidae. There are at least two described species in Bradyrhynchoides.

== Species ==
These two species belong to the genus Bradyrhynchoides:

- Bradyrhynchoides constrictus Pierce, 1913^{i c g b}
- Bradyrhynchoides rugicollis (Sharp, 1891)^{c g}

Data sources: i = ITIS, c = Catalogue of Life, g = GBIF, b = Bugguide.net
