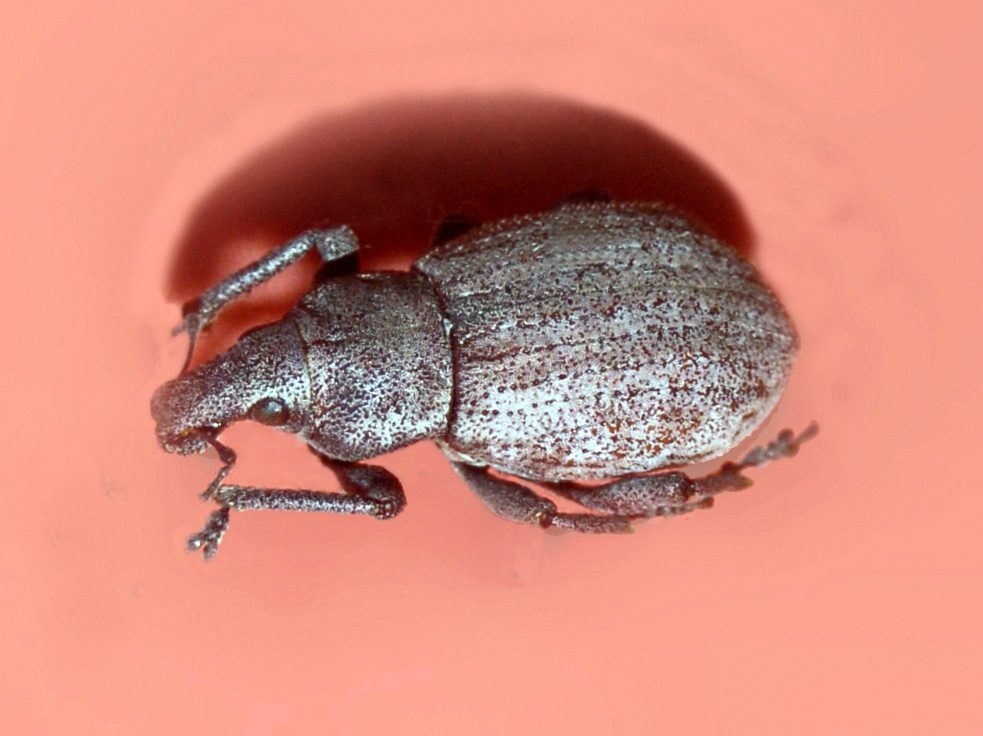
- Museum specimen of Barynotus margaritaceus

Scientific classification
- Kingdom: Animalia
- Phylum: Arthropoda
- Class: Insecta
- Order: Coleoptera
- Suborder: Polyphaga
- Infraorder: Cucujiformia
- Family: Curculionidae
- Subfamily: Entiminae
- Tribe: Geonemini
- Genus: Barynotus; Germar, 1817

Synonyms
- Kissodontus Debrochers, 1909; Merionus Dejean, 1821

= Barynotus =

Genus of beetles

Barynotus is a genus in the weevil family (Curculionidae).

== Description ==
This genus includes fairly large weevil. They feed on vegetation.

== Species ==
- Barynotus affinis Solari, 1943
- Barynotus alternans Boheman, 1834
- Barynotus balianii Solari, 1943
- Barynotus cantabricus González, 1972
- Barynotus conjux Daniel & Daniel, 1898
- Barynotus fairmairei Tournier, 1876
- Barynotus hungaricus (Tournier, 1876)
- Barynotus ibericus González, 1972
- Barynotus liguricus Solari, 1943
- Barynotus maculatus Boheman, 1842
- Barynotus mainardii Solari, 1943
- Barynotus mainardii alpicola Pesarini & Pedroni, 2011
- Barynotus makolskii Smreczynski, 1956
- Barynotus mancinii Solari, 1943
- Barynotus margaritaceus Germar, 1824
- Barynotus maritimus Hustache, 1920
- Barynotus moerens (Fabricius, 1792)
- Barynotus monguzzii Pesarini & Pedroni, 2011
- Barynotus montandoni Pic, 1899)
- Barynotus obscurus (Fabricius, 1775)
- Barynotus sabulosus (Olivier, 1807)
- Barynotus schoenherri (Zetterstedt, 1838)
- Barynotus scutatus Desbrochers, 1892
- Barynotus solarii Mainardi, 1907
- Barynotus squamosus Germar, 1824
- Barynotus umbilicatus Dufour, 1851
- Barynotus unipunctatus Dufour, 1851
