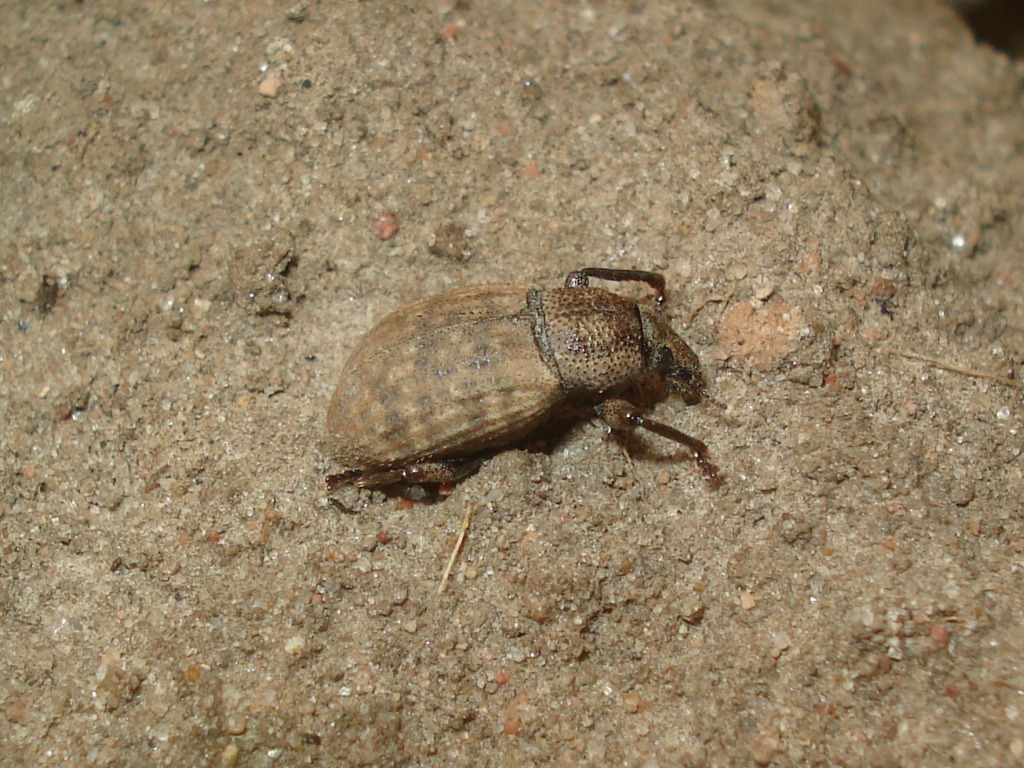
- Barynotus obscurus

Scientific classification
- Kingdom: Animalia
- Phylum: Arthropoda
- Clade: Pancrustacea
- Class: Insecta
- Order: Coleoptera
- Suborder: Polyphaga
- Infraorder: Cucujiformia
- Superfamily: Curculionoidea
- Family: Curculionidae
- Subfamily: Entiminae
- Tribe: Geonemini; Gistel, 1856

Genera
- See text

= Geonemini =

Tribe of beetles

Geonemini is a weevil tribe in the subfamily Entiminae.

== Taxonomy ==
The tribe Geonemini was first named by Gistel in 1856 (p. 373).

== Genera ==
There are 40 genera currently placed in Geonemini:

- Anomadus Horn, 1876: 21: Mexico.
- Anomonychus Faust, 1893: 298: Algeria.
- Apotomoderes Dejean, 1834: 253: Dominican Republic, Haiti, Mona.
- Artipus Sahlberg, 1823: 22: Bahamas, Cuba, Hispaniola, Jamaica, Mona, Pinos I., Puerto Rico, Saint Barthelemy; SE United States (Florida); Oligocene (USA) (?).
- Barynotellus Voss, 1962: 283: Tanzania.
- Barynotus Germar, 1817: 341: Europe; E, W Canada (I), NE United States (I).
- Bradyrhynchoides Pierce, 1913: 412: Mexico; SW United States (Texas).
- Bufomicrus Sharp, 1891: 102: Belize, Guatemala, Honduras, Nicaragua.
- Calyptillus Horn, 1876: 27: NC, SW United States.
- Claeoteges Pascoe, 1880: 427: Belize, Costa Rica, Guatemala, Honduras, Mexico, Nicaragua, Panama.
- Cleistolophus Sharp, 1891: 102: Belize, Costa Rica, Guatemala, Honduras, Mexico, Nicaragua.
- Compsonomus Jekel, 1875: 138 = Eugeonemus Buchanan, 1947: 44: Cuba, Haiti.
- Cryptolepidus Van Dyke, 1936: 191: Mexico; NW, SW United States.
- Cychrotonus Pascoe, 1871: 162: Angola; Botswana, Tanzania, Zaire.
- Decasticha Champion, 1911b: 273: Costa Rica, Panama.
- Doleropus Buchanan, 1947: 46: Cuba.
- Epicaerus Schönherr, 1834: 323: Belize, Costa Rica, El Salvador, Guatemala, Honduras, Mexico, Panama; NC, NE, NW, SE, SW United States; Oligocene (USA).
- Eumestorus Sharp, 1891: 102: Belize, Mexico.
- Geonemus Schönherr, 1833: 13: S France, Spain, Balearic Is., Algeria, Morocco.
- Graphorhinus Say, 1831: 8: NC, SW United States.
- Heteroschoinus Schönherr, 1847: 42: S Africa.
- Ischionoplus Chevrolat, 1878: IX: Cuba, Dominican Republic.
- Kosmimodes Setliff, 2019: 851: Dominican Republic.
- Lachnopus Schönherr, 1840: 380: Anguilla, Cuba, Guadeloupe, Hispaniola, Jamaica, Mona, Nevis, Puerto Rico, St. Barthélemy, St. Croix, Sint Eustatius, Saint Kitts, St. Thomas, Saint Vincent, Tortola; SE United States; Miocene (USA).
- Lyperobates Broun, 1893: 1461: New Zealand.
- Maseorhynchus Sharp, 1891: 102: Belize, Guatemala, Mexico.
- Mazenes Champion, 1911: 280: Guatemala, Mexico.
- Melathra Franz, 2011: 353: Dominican Republic.
- Naupactopsis Champion, 1911: 278: Mexico.
- Omileus Horn, 1876: 102: Mexico; SW United States; Miocene (USA).
- Plenaschopsis Blaisdell, 1925: 341: Mexico.
- Prosayleus Schönherr, 1840: 840: Australia.
- Pseudomelactus Heller, 1916: 312: New Caledonia.
- Pycnophilus Sharp, 1891: 166: Costa Rica.
- Scelianoma Franz & Girón, 2009: 220: Puerto Rico.
- Sciorhinus Sharp, 1891: 102: Mexico.
- Stamoderes Casey, 1888: 236: W Canada, NW, SW United States.
- Stereogaster Van Dyke, 1936b: 84: SW United States.
- Tenillus Scudder, 1893: 35: (+) Oligocene (USA)
- Trigonoscuta Motschulsky, 1853: 79: Mexico; W Canada, NW, SW United States; Miocene (USA).
