= Sepia braggi =

Conservation status
- Least Concern (IUCN 3.1)

Scientific classification
- Kingdom: Animalia
- Phylum: Mollusca
- Class: Cephalopoda
- Order: Sepiida
- Family: Sepiidae
- Genus: Sepia
- Subgenus: Doratosepion
- Species: S. braggi

Binomial name
- Sepia braggi Verco, 1907

Species of cuttlefish

Sepia braggi, the slender cuttlefish, is a species of cuttlefish native to the Indo-Pacific Ocean. It has been found in coastal waters of southern Australia. This species was first collected in South Australia by its namesake, William Lawrence Bragg. Sepia braggi was then described by Sir Joseph Cooke Verco in 1907.Sepia braggi is part of the subgenus Doratosepion which contains to 41 species of cuttlefish in total.

== Description ==
Sepia braggi is a relatively small species of cuttlefish. Females of the species are larger than males and they grow to a mantle length of 80 mm and 49 mm, respectively. The mantle elongates to 3 times longer than it is wide. The mantle is cigar-shaped and triangular towards the anterior end. Narrow fins extend along the lateral margin of the mantle and widen along the posterior. The head is short and narrower than the mantle. The cuttlebone tends to have a similar length to the mantle. The common name of S. braggi originates from its slender cuttlebone, which is lanceolate in shape. The tentacular club is relatively short, with five rows of suckers. The suckers are all approximately the same size except for 5 or 6 suckers in the middle row which are 2 to 3 times larger. The suckers on the arms are dispersed and minute in size. The arms of the males are large compared to the females, with 35.2 mm to 57.8 mm in length, while the arms of the female range from 30.6 mm to 39.6 mm in length. In contrast to similar species, the hectocotylus is absent. This cuttlefish can also be identified by its beak, which is useful for examining the stomachs of fish. Of the Sepia genus, S. braggi is only species that does not have a darkened lateral band on the upper and lower beak. Also, on the upper beak, the fully darkened section is much smaller (2.6 mm) than other species of Sepia.

The head and mantle of Sepia braggi are a buff, pinkish brown in color. The fins tend to be pale brown and the ridges along the mantle are orange-pink. What separates Sepia braggi from all other species of cuttlefish are the short purple bars and blotches on the arms. This pigmentation is very distinctive and clearly visible, even on smaller or juvenile specimens.

== Distribution ==
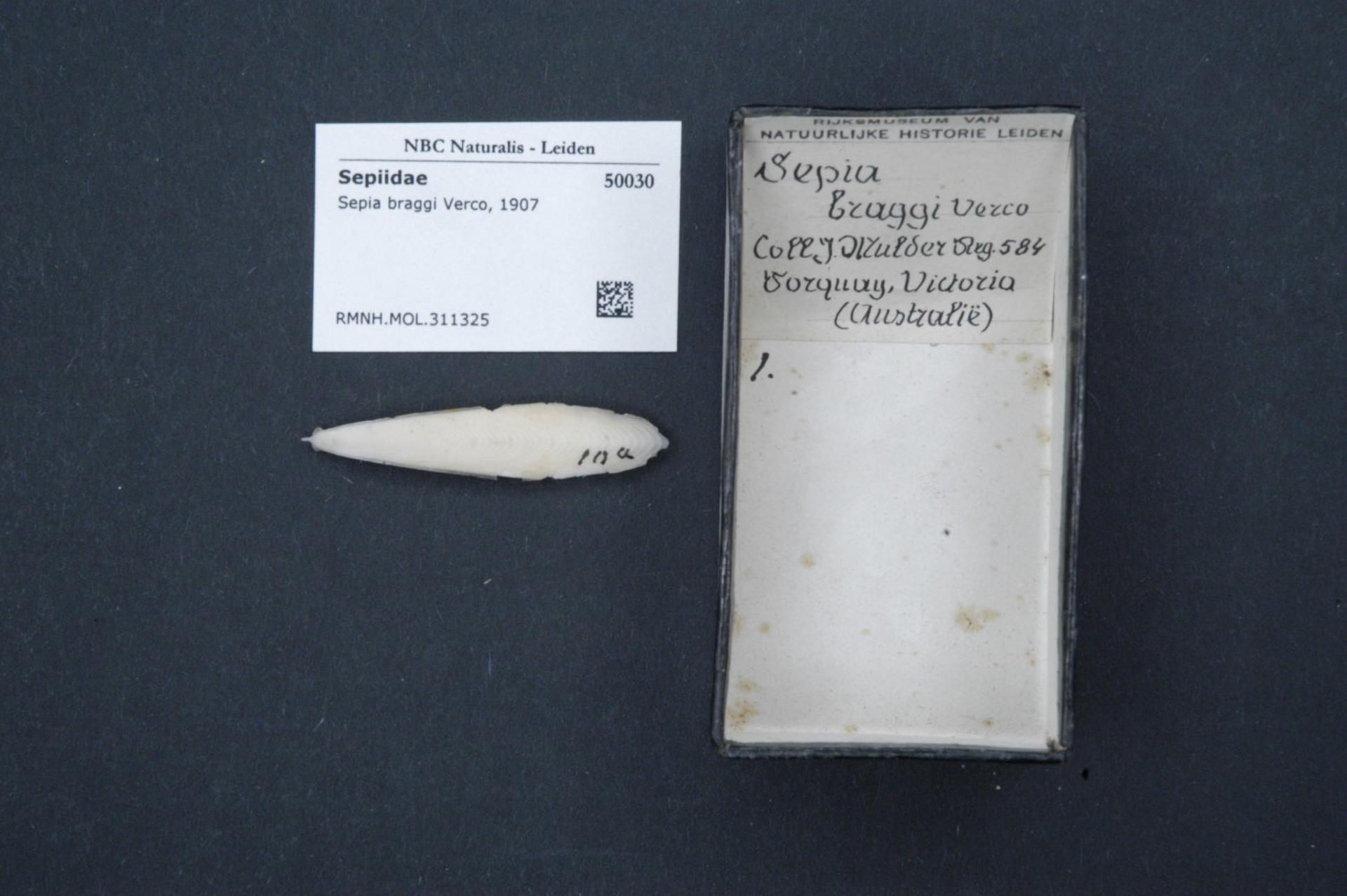
This image shows the cuttlebone that Sir Joseph Cooke Verco used to identify Sepia braggi as separate species.

Sepia braggi are located in Southern Australia, from southern New South Wales to Western Australia. It is a demersal species, typically found in depth between 30 and 86 meters. One source does give a maximum depth for S. braggi of 176 m, though it is possible that those from greater depths may have been misidentified and perhaps refer to the species of S. limata, S. rhoda or S. vercoi. The Dorarosepion species from the from southern and eastern Australia are largely allopatric, though there is some overlap in the distribution of S. braggi and S. cottoni off south-western Australia. Sepia braggi is one of three species of cuttlefish known to inhabit Spencer Gulf in South Australia. Specimens are rarely caught there by prawn trawlers.

== Diet and ecology ==
Similar to other cuttlefish species, S. braggi feeds on small crabs, other crustaceans and fish. Sharks, large fish and seals are known predators of cuttlefish. Sepia apama and Sepia novaehollandiae are the main competitors of the Sepia braggi as both species are larger and more common.

== Fisheries ==
Sepia braggi are rarely encountered and are relatively small. Therefore, the species is classified by fisheries as low value and S. braggi is only caught as by-catch.
