= Sepia mascarensis =

Conservation status
- Data Deficient (IUCN 3.1)

Scientific classification
- Kingdom: Animalia
- Phylum: Mollusca
- Class: Cephalopoda
- Order: Sepiida
- Family: Sepiidae
- Genus: Sepia
- Subgenus: Doratosepion
- Species: S. mascarensis

Binomial name
- Sepia mascarensis Filippova & Khromov, 1991

Species of cuttlefish

Sepia mascarensis is a species of cuttlefish native to the western Indian Ocean, specifically Saya-de-Malha Bank (11°31′S 61°00′E), Mascarene Ridge, and Cargados-Carajos Shoals. It lives at depths of between 87 and 325 m.

Sepia mascarensis grows to a mantle length of 67 to 124 mm.

The type specimen was collected in the Saya-de-Malha Bank, Indian Ocean. It is deposited at the Zoological Museum in Moscow.
