= Sepia bathyalis =

Conservation status
- Data Deficient (IUCN 3.1)

Scientific classification
- Kingdom: Animalia
- Phylum: Mollusca
- Class: Cephalopoda
- Order: Sepiida
- Family: Sepiidae
- Genus: Sepia
- Subgenus: Doratosepion
- Species: S. bathyalis

Binomial name
- Sepia bathyalis Nikitina & Nesis, 1991

Species of cuttlefish

Sepia bathyalis is a species of cuttlefish native to the southwestern Indian Ocean, specifically northwestern and southwestern Madagascar. It lives at a depth of between 300 and 500 m.

Sepia bathyalis grows to a mantle length of 80 mm.

The type specimen was collected near Madagascar (22°19′S 43°06′E to 22°23′S 43°06′E). It is deposited at the Zoological Museum in Moscow.
