= Sepia tala =

Conservation status
- Data Deficient (IUCN 3.1)

Scientific classification
- Kingdom: Animalia
- Phylum: Mollusca
- Class: Cephalopoda
- Order: Sepiida
- Family: Sepiidae
- Genus: Sepia
- Subgenus: Doratosepion
- Species: S. tala

Binomial name
- Sepia tala Khromov, Nikitina & Nesis, 1991

Species of cuttlefish

Sepia tala is a species of cuttlefish native to the southwestern Indian Ocean, specifically southwestern Madagascar off Cape Tala. It is known only from the type locality. S. tala lives at depths of 325 to 332 m.

Sepia tala grows to a mantle length of 80 mm.

The type specimen was collected off Cape Tala (22°19'S to 22°23'S, 43°06'E) and is deposited at the Zoological Museum in Moscow.
