= Sepia senta =

Conservation status
- Least Concern (IUCN 3.1)

Scientific classification
- Kingdom: Animalia
- Phylum: Mollusca
- Class: Cephalopoda
- Order: Sepiida
- Family: Sepiidae
- Genus: Sepia
- Species: S. senta

Binomial name
- Sepia senta Lu & Reid, 1997

Species of cuttlefish

Sepia senta is a species of cuttlefish native to the southeastern Indian Ocean, specifically the North West Shelf in Western Australia (12°04′S 122°51′E to 18°44′S 116°59′E). It is possibly also present in Indonesia. Reid et al. (2005) note that "a very similar, probably closely related animal has been found in the Philippines". S. senta lives at depths of 256 to 426 m.

Females are on average larger than males. They grow to 83 mm and 62 mm in mantle length, respectively.

The type specimen was collected off Western Australia (14°07′S 122°06′E) and is deposited at the Museum of Victoria in Melbourne.
