= Sepia saya =

Conservation status
- Data Deficient (IUCN 3.1)

Scientific classification
- Kingdom: Animalia
- Phylum: Mollusca
- Class: Cephalopoda
- Order: Sepiida
- Family: Sepiidae
- Genus: Sepia
- Subgenus: Doratosepion
- Species: S. saya

Binomial name
- Sepia saya Khromov, Nikitina & Nesis, 1991

Species of cuttlefish

Sepia saya is a species of cuttlefish known only from its type locality in the southwestern Indian Ocean. It lives at depths of 87 to 117 m.

Sepia saya grows to a mantle length of 90 mm.

The type specimen was collected near the Saya-de-Malha Bank in the Indian Ocean (10°30′S 61°10′E to 10°32′S 61°11′E). It is deposited at the Zoological Museum in Moscow.
