= Sepia mirabilis =

Conservation status
- Data Deficient (IUCN 3.1)

Scientific classification
- Kingdom: Animalia
- Phylum: Mollusca
- Class: Cephalopoda
- Order: Sepiida
- Family: Sepiidae
- Genus: Sepia
- Subgenus: Doratosepion
- Species: S. mirabilis

Binomial name
- Sepia mirabilis Khromov, 1988

Species of cuttlefish

Sepia mirabilis is a species of cuttlefish native to the western Indian Ocean. Specifically, it is present off Sokotra Island, and its natural range probably stretches to the east coast of Africa. It lives at depths to 50 m.

Sepia mirabilis grows to a mantle length of 70 mm.

The type specimen was collected in the Arabian Sea (12°22′N 54°28′E). It is deposited at the Zoological Museum in Moscow.
