= Sepia irvingi =

Conservation status
- Least Concern (IUCN 3.1)

Scientific classification
- Kingdom: Animalia
- Phylum: Mollusca
- Class: Cephalopoda
- Order: Sepiida
- Family: Sepiidae
- Genus: Sepia
- Subgenus: Sepia
- Species: S. irvingi

Binomial name
- Sepia irvingi Meyer, 1909

Species of cuttlefish

Sepia irvingi is a species of cuttlefish native to the southeastern Indian Ocean, specifically western Australia, from Cockburn Sound to North West Shelf (18°49′S 118°29′E). It lives at a depth of between 130 metres (430 ft) and 170 metres (560 ft).

Sepia irvingi grows to a mantle length of 100 millimetres (3.9 in).

The type specimens were collected off Garden Island, Cockburn Sound (32°11′S 115°43′E), Port Royal, King George Sound (35°03′S 117°58′E), and Warnbro Sound (32°20′S 115°43′E) in South Africa. They are deposited at the Western Australian Museum in Perth.
