= Sepia ivanovi =

Conservation status
- Data Deficient (IUCN 3.1)

Scientific classification
- Kingdom: Animalia
- Phylum: Mollusca
- Class: Cephalopoda
- Order: Sepiida
- Family: Sepiidae
- Genus: Sepia
- Subgenus: Doratosepion
- Species: S. ivanovi

Binomial name
- Sepia ivanovi Khromov, 1982

Species of cuttlefish

Sepia ivanovi is a species of cuttlefish native to the southwestern Indian Ocean, and throughout southeast Africa, including Kenya, and Mozambique, to the mouth of the Zambezi River. It lives at depths up to 50 m.

Sepia ivanovi grows to a mantle length of 70 mm.

The type specimen was collected near Mombasa, Kenya (04°03′S 40°00′E). It is deposited at the Zoological Museum in Moscow.
