= Sepia plathyconchalis =

Conservation status
- Data Deficient (IUCN 3.1)

Scientific classification
- Kingdom: Animalia
- Phylum: Mollusca
- Class: Cephalopoda
- Order: Sepiida
- Family: Sepiidae
- Genus: Sepia
- Subgenus: Sepia
- Species: S. plathyconchalis

Binomial name
- Sepia plathyconchalis Filippova & Khromov, 1991

Species of cuttlefish

Sepia plathyconchalis is a species of cuttlefish native to the western Indian Ocean, specifically the Saya-de-Malha Bank, Cargados-Carajos Shoals, and St Brandon Shoals. It lives in shallow waters at depths of between 25 and 63 m.

Sepia plathyconchalis grows to a mantle length of 8 to 63 mm.

The type specimen was collected in the Saya-de-Malha Bank, Indian Ocean (09°42′S 61°08′E). It is deposited at the Zoological Museum in Moscow.
