= Sepia koilados =

Conservation status
- Least Concern (IUCN 3.1)

Scientific classification
- Kingdom: Animalia
- Phylum: Mollusca
- Class: Cephalopoda
- Order: Sepiida
- Family: Sepiidae
- Genus: Sepia
- Subgenus: Doratosepion
- Species: S. koilados

Binomial name
- Sepia koilados Reid, 2000

Species of cuttlefish

Sepia koilados is a species of cuttlefish native to the southeastern Indian Ocean, specifically the North West Shelf in western Australia (18°31′S 118°09′E to 19°12.6′S 116°25.8′E). It lives at depths of between 182 and 203 m.

Males are slightly larger than females. They grow to a mantle length of 68 mm and 58 mm, respectively.

The type specimen was collected in the North West Shelf (18°36′S 118°02′E to 18°39′S 118°04′E). It is deposited at the Museum of Victoria in Melbourne.
