= Sepia plana =

Conservation status
- Least Concern (IUCN 3.1)

Scientific classification
- Kingdom: Animalia
- Phylum: Mollusca
- Class: Cephalopoda
- Order: Sepiida
- Family: Sepiidae
- Genus: Sepia
- Species: S. plana

Binomial name
- Sepia plana Lu & Reid, 1997

Species of cuttlefish

Sepia plana is a species of cuttlefish native to the coast of Australia, specifically the North West Shelf (12°04′S 122°59′E to 17°55.5′S 118°16.0′E). However, cuttlebones of this species have also been found off eastern Australia, suggesting that it may have a wider distribution. S. plana lives at depths of between 396 and 505 m.

S. plana exhibits sexual dimorphism, as females grow considerably larger than males. They reach a mantle length of 151 mm and 99 mm, respectively.

The type specimen was collected in the North West Shelf, western Australia (14°15′S 121°59′E). It is deposited at the Museum of Victoria in Melbourne.
