= Sepia sokotriensis =

Conservation status
- Data Deficient (IUCN 3.1)

Scientific classification
- Kingdom: Animalia
- Phylum: Mollusca
- Class: Cephalopoda
- Order: Sepiida
- Family: Sepiidae
- Genus: Sepia
- Subgenus: Doratosepion
- Species: S. sokotriensis

Binomial name
- Sepia sokotriensis Khromov, 1988

Species of cuttlefish

Sepia sokotriensis is a species of cuttlefish native to the western Indian Ocean, specifically off Sokotra Island, and probably east Africa. It lives at depths to 100 m.

Sepia sokotriensis grows to a mantle length of 80 mm.

The type specimen was collected near Sokotra Island in the Arabian Sea (12°10′N 54°25′E). It is deposited at the Zoological Museum in Moscow.
