= Sepia adami =

Conservation status
- Data Deficient (IUCN 3.1)

Scientific classification
- Kingdom: Animalia
- Phylum: Mollusca
- Class: Cephalopoda
- Order: Sepiida
- Family: Sepiidae
- Genus: Sepia
- Subgenus: Doratosepion
- Species: S. adami

Binomial name
- Sepia adami Roeleveld, 1972

Species of cuttlefish

Sepia adami is a species of cuttlefish native to the southwestern Indian Ocean. It is known only from the type locality, S 79ºE off Cape Natal. It lives at a depth of up to 99 m.

Females are known to reach a mantle length of at least 59 mm.

The type specimen is deposited at the South African Museum.
