= Sepia joubini =

Conservation status
- Data Deficient (IUCN 3.1)

Scientific classification
- Kingdom: Animalia
- Phylum: Mollusca
- Class: Cephalopoda
- Order: Sepiida
- Family: Sepiidae
- Genus: Sepia
- Subgenus: Doratosepion
- Species: S. joubini

Binomial name
- Sepia joubini Massy, 1927

Species of cuttlefish

Sepia joubini is a species of cuttlefish native to the southwestern Indian Ocean, specifically South Africa, off Tugela River Mouth (29°11′S 31°25′E), to Cape Natal, off southern Mozambique (24ºS to 25ºS), and in the Saya-de-Malha Bank. It lives at a depth of between 66 and 170 m.

Females of S. joubini grow to a mantle length of 64 mm.

The type specimen was collected off Durban, South Africa. It is deposited at The Natural History Museum in London. The specific name honours Prof. Dr. Louis Marie Adolphe Olivier Édouard Joubin (1861-1935), a professor at the Muséum national d'Histoire naturelle in Paris and the species was named by the Irish zoologist Annie Massy.
