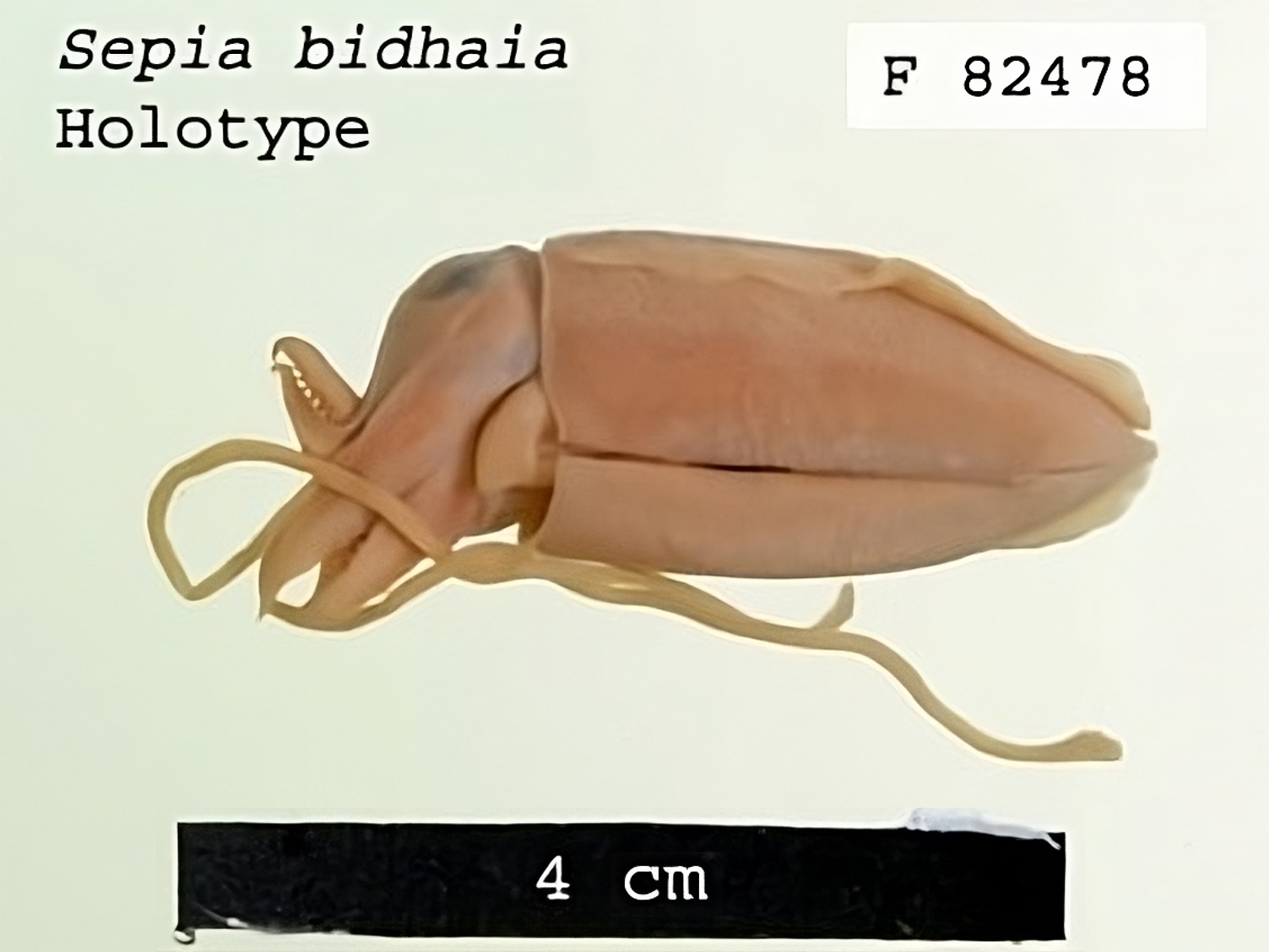

Conservation status
- Least Concern (IUCN 3.1)

Scientific classification
- Kingdom: Animalia
- Phylum: Mollusca
- Class: Cephalopoda
- Order: Sepiida
- Family: Sepiidae
- Genus: Sepia
- Subgenus: Doratosepion
- Species: S. bidhaia

Binomial name
- Sepia bidhaia Reid, 2000

= Sepia bidhaia =

Species of cuttlefish

Sepia bidhaia is a species of cuttlefish native to the southwestern Pacific Ocean, specifically the waters off the Great Barrier Reef (17°20′S 146°41.5′E to 22°07′S 153°19′E). It lives at a depth of between 200 and 304 m.

Females of this species are slightly larger than males. They grow to a mantle length of 57 mm and 37 mm, respectively.

The type specimen was collected near Queensland, Australia (17°55.8′S 146°58.2′E). It is deposited at the Museum of Victoria in Melbourne.
