= Sepia confusa =

Conservation status
- Data Deficient (IUCN 3.1)

Scientific classification
- Kingdom: Animalia
- Phylum: Mollusca
- Class: Cephalopoda
- Order: Sepiida
- Family: Sepiidae
- Genus: Sepia
- Subgenus: Doratosepion
- Species: S. confusa

Binomial name
- Sepia confusa Smith, 1916

Species of cuttlefish

Sepia confusa is a species of cuttlefish native to the southwestern Indian Ocean, specifically southeastern Africa from Port Elizabeth to southern Mozambique, Zanzibar and Pemba (5° to 30ºS), and Madagascar. S. confusa has also been erroneously recorded from the Arabian Sea. A record from the Saya-de-Malha Bank has not been confirmed by recent expeditions. The species lives at a depth of between 53 and 352 m.

Sepia confusa grows to a mantle length of 150 mm.

The type specimen was collected near Tongaat Beach, Port Elizabeth, South Africa. It is deposited at The Natural History Museum in London.
