= Sepia zanzibarica =

Conservation status
- Data Deficient (IUCN 3.1)

Scientific classification
- Kingdom: Animalia
- Phylum: Mollusca
- Class: Cephalopoda
- Order: Sepiida
- Family: Sepiidae
- Genus: Sepia
- Subgenus: Acanthosepion
- Species: S. zanzibarica

Binomial name
- Sepia zanzibarica Pfeffer, 1884

Species of cuttlefish

Sepia zanzibarica, or the Zanzibar cuttlefish, is a species of cuttlefish native to the Indian Ocean.

== Description ==
The arms of Sepia zanzibarica each possess four series of suckers. The left ventral arm is modified into a hectocotylus which features 6 rows of suckers. This suckers are significantly reduced in size in the middle portion of the arm, gradually returning to normal size towards the tip. The oral surface of modified region is wide, engorged, fleshyand has transversely grooved ridges. The suckers of two each of the dorsal and ventral series are laterally displaced and widely separated while another 2 ventral serues are so close that the sucker rows appear to alternate. The tentacular clubs are short and oval with six suckers in crosswise rows, the suckers vary in size with some on the inner rows being a little largers than the others The swimming keel of the club reaches slightly beyond the carpus at the end nearest the head and the ventral protective membranes do not join at the club base. There are a small number of tiny suckers on the buccal membrane. The cuttlebone is oblong in shape, rounded on the anterior and posterior edges, a strongly recurved ventral surface and an evenly convex dorsal surface. The mantle length averages 250 mm.

== Distribution ==
Sepia zanzibarica is found in the western Indian Ocean, specifically along the east coats of Africa. Its distribution extends from Port Elizabeth in the Eastern Cape Province of South Africa north to Djibouti and the Gulf of Aden, it is also found off Madagascar, the Comoro Islands and the Mascarene Islands, as well as the Seychelles and Socotra.

== Biology ==
Sepia zanzibarica occurs at depths of 34 to 95 m.

== Fisheries ==
Sepia zanzibarica is a commercially important quarry for fisheries in the Gulf of Aden and it is probably an important part of the mixed species fisheries along costa of eastern African and in deeper waters.
