= Sepia tanybracheia =

Conservation status
- Data Deficient (IUCN 3.1)

Scientific classification
- Kingdom: Animalia
- Phylum: Mollusca
- Class: Cephalopoda
- Order: Sepiida
- Family: Sepiidae
- Genus: Sepia
- Subgenus: Doratosepion
- Species: S. tanybracheia

Binomial name
- Sepia tanybracheia Reid, 2000

Species of cuttlefish

Sepia tanybracheia is a species of cuttlefish native to the southeastern Indian Ocean. It is known only from the type locality. S. tanybracheia lives at depths of 200 to 205 m.

Males grow to a mantle length of 51 mm.

The type specimen was collected off Western Australia (12°36′S 123°45′E) and is deposited at the Museum of Victoria in Melbourne.
