= Sepia aureomaculata =

Conservation status
- Data Deficient (IUCN 3.1)

Scientific classification
- Kingdom: Animalia
- Phylum: Mollusca
- Class: Cephalopoda
- Order: Sepiida
- Family: Sepiidae
- Genus: Sepia
- Subgenus: Doratosepion
- Species: S. aureomaculata

Binomial name
- Sepia aureomaculata Okutani & Horikawa, in Okutani, Tagawa & Horikawa, 1987

Species of cuttlefish

Sepia aureomaculata is a species of cuttlefish native to the northwestern Pacific Ocean, specifically the Kii Channel, Tosa Bay, Hyuga-Nada, and the East China Sea. It lives at a depth of between 190 and 350 m.

Sepia aureomaculata grows to a mantle length of 160 mm.

The type specimen was collected in Tosa Bay, Japan and is deposited at the National Science Museum of Japan in Tokyo. Marine biota in Tosa Bay have been found to have relatively high concentrations of PCBs, DDT and a variety of organochlorine chemical pesticides, compared to similar biota in the Sulu Sea.
