= Sepia burnupi =

Conservation status
- Data Deficient (IUCN 3.1)

Scientific classification
- Kingdom: Animalia
- Phylum: Mollusca
- Class: Cephalopoda
- Order: Sepiida
- Family: Sepiidae
- Genus: Sepia
- Subgenus: Doratosepion
- Species: S. burnupi

Binomial name
- Sepia burnupi Hoyle, 1904

Synonyms
- Sepia exsignata Barnard, 1962

Species of mollusc

Sepia burnupi is a species of cuttlefish native to the southwestern Indian Ocean, specifically southeast Africa, from Port Elizabeth to southern Mozambique and the Saya-de-Malha Bank. It lives at a depth of between 40 and 240 m.

Sepia burnupi grows to a mantle length of 90 mm.

The type specimen was collected near Umkomaas, KwaZulu-Natal, South Africa. It is deposited at The Natural History Museum in London.
