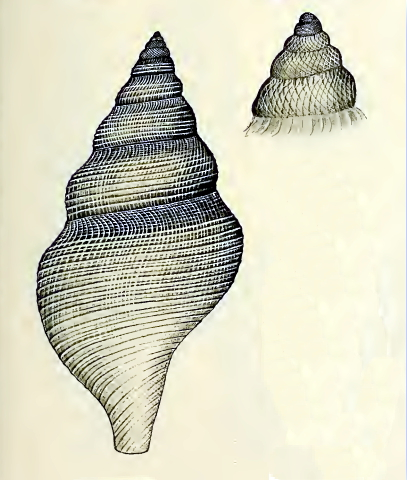
- Original image of a shell of Daphnella stiphra

Scientific classification
- Kingdom: Animalia
- Phylum: Mollusca
- Class: Gastropoda
- Subclass: Caenogastropoda
- Order: Neogastropoda
- Superfamily: Conoidea
- Family: Raphitomidae
- Genus: Daphnella
- Species: D. stiphra

Binomial name
- Daphnella stiphra Verco, 1909

Synonyms
- Daphnella (Daphnella) stiphra Verco, 1909

= Daphnella stiphra =

Species of gastropod

Daphnella stiphra is a species of sea snail, a marine gastropod mollusk in the family Raphitomidae.

== Description ==
The length of the shell attains 8.5 mm, its diameter 4 mm.

(Original description) The shell is fragile, short and has a biconic shape. The brown protoconch consists of 4½ whorls, the apical 1½ with close spiral lirae, punctate between, the rest latticed by the crossing of two sets of crowded oblique lirae. The whorls are convex with deep sutures. The four whorls in the spire are convex, roundly angled just below the centre; the sutures deep. The body whorl is tumid and contracted at the base. The aperture is obliquely oval. The (broken) outer lip is thin and simple. The inner lip is represented by a smooth, glazed area. The columella is straight and barely concave. The siphonal canal is short and open. The round and simple sinus is situated at the suture.

Sculpture. In the concave space just below the suture are crowded very fine spirals, eight in the penultimate. Below a prominent thread which bounds this space are more distant and stouter lirae, two in the first whorl, three in the second, four in the third, eight in the fourth, and about forty in the body whorl. Axial threadlets concave forwards to the prominent spiral thread, and convex forwards thence to the suture, run in the body whorl over the base to the siphonal anal.

== Distribution ==
This marine species is endemic to Australia and occurs off South Australia.
