= Sepia acuminata =

Conservation status
- Data Deficient (IUCN 3.1)

Scientific classification
- Kingdom: Animalia
- Phylum: Mollusca
- Class: Cephalopoda
- Order: Sepiida
- Family: Sepiidae
- Genus: Sepia
- Subgenus: Rhombosepion
- Species: S. acuminata

Binomial name
- Sepia acuminata Smith, 1916

Species of cuttlefish

Sepia acuminata is a species of cuttlefish native to the southwestern Indian Ocean, from Port Elizabeth, South Africa to Somalia (01º30'N–30ºS), and Madagascar. It lives at a depth of between 44 and 369 m.

Females are slightly larger than males, growing to 120 mm and 100 mm in mantle length, respectively.

The type specimen was collected near Tongaat Beach, Port Elizabeth, South Africa and is held in the Natural History Museum, London.
