= Sepia gibba =

Conservation status
- Data Deficient (IUCN 3.1)

Scientific classification
- Kingdom: Animalia
- Phylum: Mollusca
- Class: Cephalopoda
- Order: Sepiida
- Family: Sepiidae
- Genus: Sepia
- Subgenus: Sepia
- Species: S. gibba

Binomial name
- Sepia gibba Ehrenberg, 1831

Synonyms
- Sepia lefebrei Orbigny, 1845

Species of cuttlefish

Sepia gibba is a species of cuttlefish native to the Red Sea. The depth range of S. gibba is unknown, although it is at least as shallow as 1 m.

Sepia gibba grows to a mantle length of 100 mm.

The type specimen was collected in the Red Sea and is deposited at the Zoologisches Museum in Berlin.
