= Sepia simoniana =

Conservation status
- Data Deficient (IUCN 3.1)

Scientific classification
- Kingdom: Animalia
- Phylum: Mollusca
- Class: Cephalopoda
- Order: Sepiida
- Family: Sepiidae
- Genus: Sepia
- Subgenus: Sepia
- Species: S. simoniana

Binomial name
- Sepia simoniana Thiele, 1920

Synonyms
- Sepia natalensis Massy, 1925

Species of cuttlefish

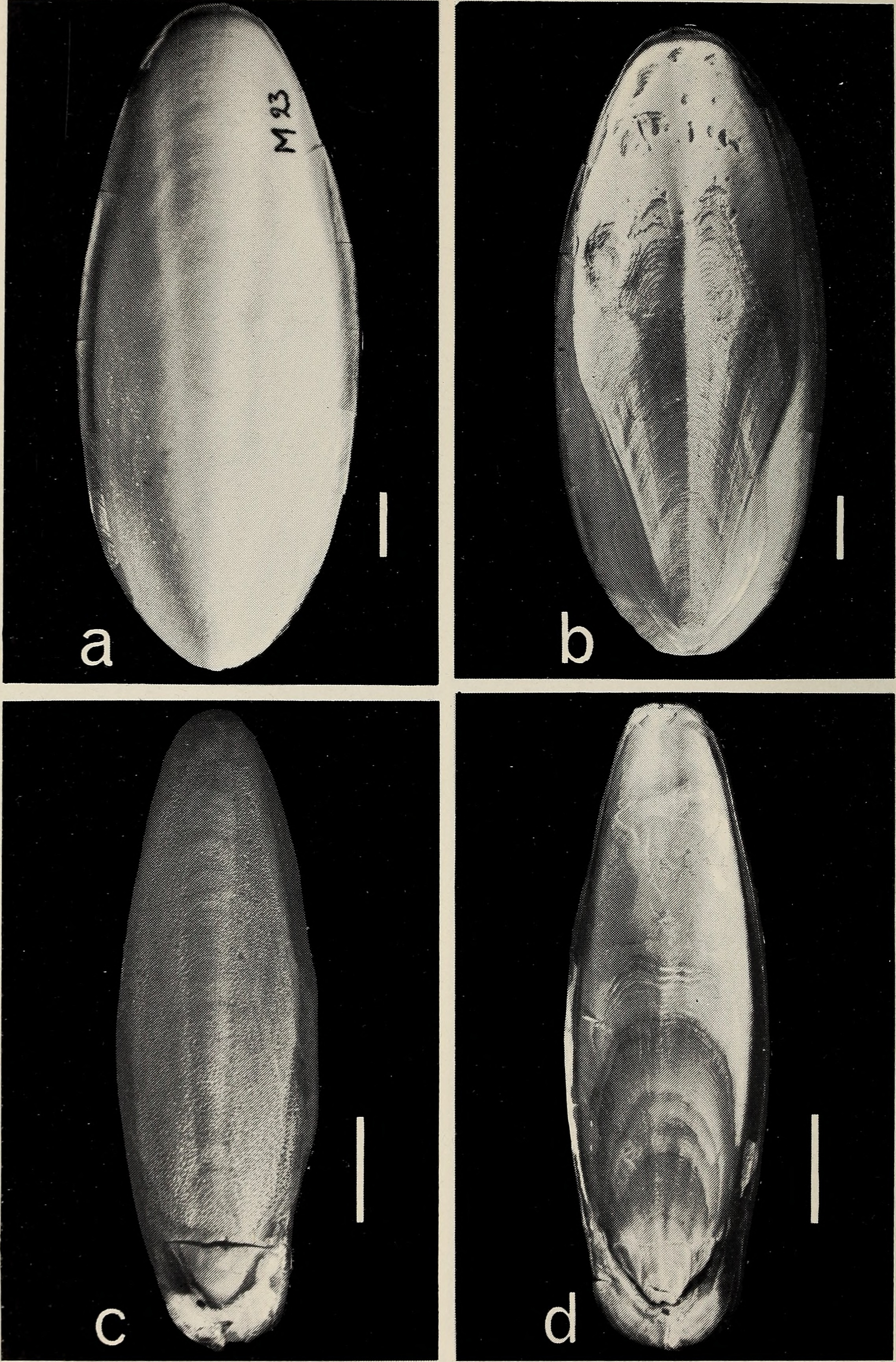

Sepia simoniana is a species of cuttlefish native to the western Indian Ocean. Its natural distribution stretches from Cape Town to Agulhas Bank, north to northern Kenya and southern Mozambique. It is also present in the Saya-de-Malha Bank. S. simoniana usually lives at depths of less than 100 m, although it has been recorded down to 190 m.

Sepia simoniana grows to a mantle length of 185 mm.

The type specimen was collected off Simon's Bay, South Africa. It is deposited at the Zoologisches Museum in Berlin.
