= Sepia mira =

Conservation status
- Least Concern (IUCN 3.1)

Scientific classification
- Kingdom: Animalia
- Phylum: Mollusca
- Class: Cephalopoda
- Order: Sepiida
- Family: Sepiidae
- Genus: Sepia
- Species: S. mira

Binomial name
- Sepia mira (Cotton, 1932)

Synonyms
- Tenuisepia mira Cotton, 1932

Species of cuttlefish

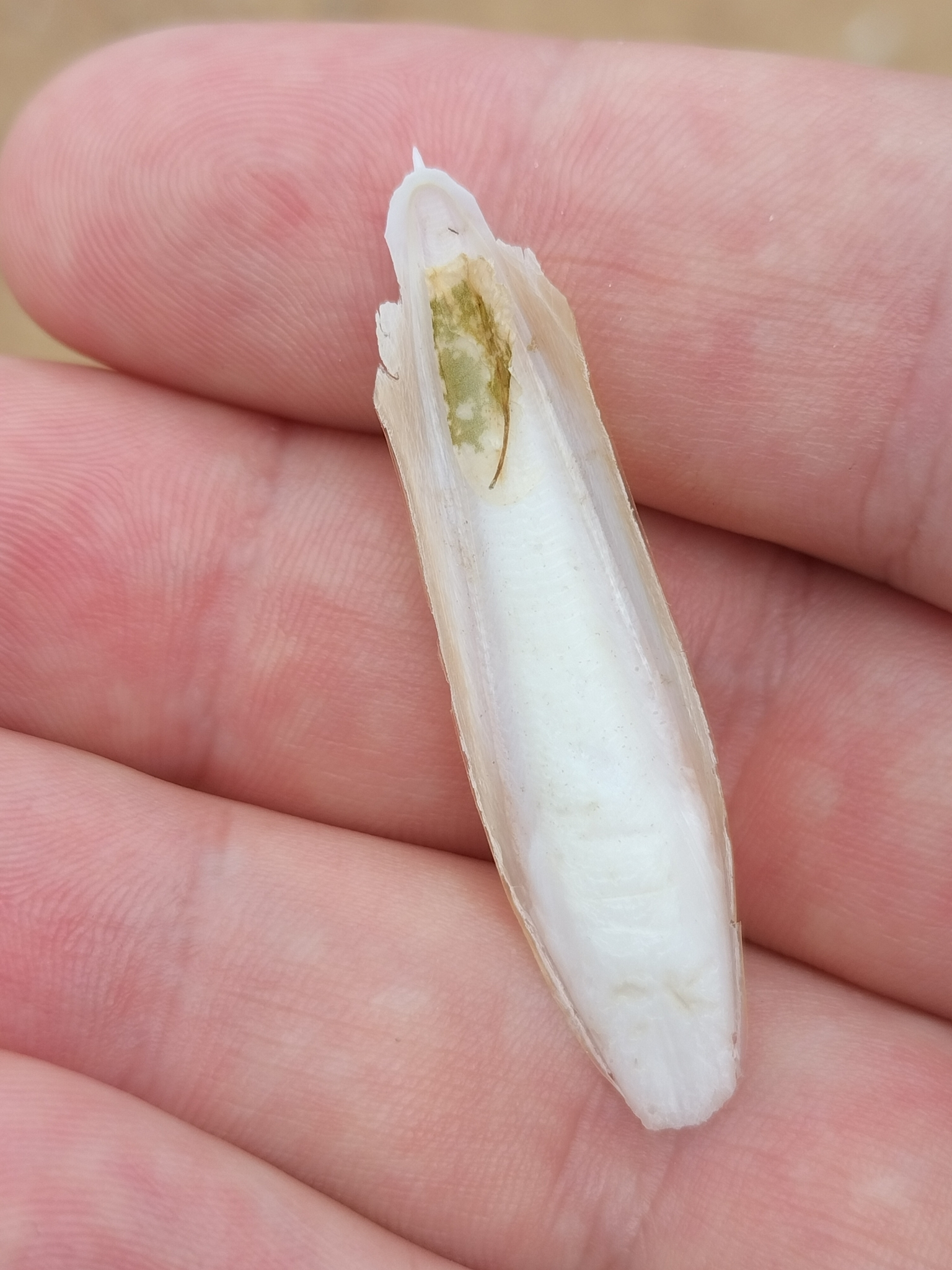
Little Cuttlefish (Sepia mira)

Sepia mira is a species of cuttlefish native to the southwestern Pacific Ocean, specifically from the mouth of Clarence River, New South Wales (29°19′S 153°29′E) to off Wooli (29°49′S 153°27′E) in Australia. It lives at depths of between 20 and 72 m.

S. mira grows to a mantle length of 55 mm.

The type specimen was collected in Capricorn Group, North-West Islet, Queensland (23°18′S 151°42′E). It is deposited at the South Australian Museum in Adelaide.
