= Sepia subtenuipes =

Conservation status
- Data Deficient (IUCN 3.1)

Scientific classification
- Kingdom: Animalia
- Phylum: Mollusca
- Class: Cephalopoda
- Order: Sepiida
- Family: Sepiidae
- Genus: Sepia
- Subgenus: Doratosepion
- Species: S. subtenuipes

Binomial name
- Sepia subtenuipes Okutani & Horikawa, 1987

Species of cuttlefish

Sepia subtenuipes is a species of cuttlefish native to the western Pacific Ocean, specifically the East China Sea and the Kii Channel in southwestern Japan. It lives at depths of 90 to 300 m.

Sepia subtenuipes grows to a mantle length of 94 mm.

The type specimen was collected off the coast of Japan and is deposited at the National Science Museum in Tokyo.
