= Sepia incerta =

Conservation status
- Data Deficient (IUCN 3.1)

Scientific classification
- Kingdom: Animalia
- Phylum: Mollusca
- Class: Cephalopoda
- Order: Sepiida
- Family: Sepiidae
- Genus: Sepia
- Subgenus: Doratosepion
- Species: S. incerta

Binomial name
- Sepia incerta Smith, 1916

Species of cuttlefish

Sepia incerta is a species of cuttlefish native to the southwestern Indian Ocean, specifically south and east Africa, from Port Elizabeth to Mozambique (north to 18ºS). It is also present in the Saya-de-Malha Bank. S. incerta lives at a depth of between 90 and 345 m.

Sepia incerta grows to a mantle length of 150 mm.

The type specimen was collected near Tongaat Beach, KwaZulu-Natal and Port Elizabeth, Cape Province in South Africa. It is deposited at The Natural History Museum in London.
