= Sepia insignis =

Conservation status
- Data Deficient (IUCN 3.1)

Scientific classification
- Kingdom: Animalia
- Phylum: Mollusca
- Class: Cephalopoda
- Order: Sepiida
- Family: Sepiidae
- Genus: Sepia
- Subgenus: Sepia
- Species: S. insignis

Binomial name
- Sepia insignis Smith, 1916

Species of cuttlefish

Sepia insignis is a species of cuttlefish native to the southwestern Indian Ocean, specifically South Africa, from the Cape of Good Hope to Natal. It lives at depths to 42 m.

Sepia insignis grows to a mantle length of 60 mm.

The type specimens, consisting solely of cuttlebones, were collected on Tongaat Beach, KwaZulu-Natal, South Africa (29°35′S 31°07′E). They are deposited at The Natural History Museum in London.
