= Sepia sewelli =

Conservation status
- Data Deficient (IUCN 3.1)

Scientific classification
- Kingdom: Animalia
- Phylum: Mollusca
- Class: Cephalopoda
- Order: Sepiida
- Family: Sepiidae
- Genus: Sepia
- Subgenus: Doratosepion
- Species: S. sewelli

Binomial name
- Sepia sewelli Adam & Rees, 1966

Species of cuttlefish

Sepia sewelli is a species of cuttlefish native to the western Indian Ocean, from Cape Guardafui, Somalia (11°57′N 50°35′E to 05°40′S 39°17′E) to Zanzibar and probably Madagascar. It lives at depths of 37 to 238 m.

Sepia sewelli grows to a mantle length of 30 mm.

The type specimen was collected near Cape Guardafui (11°57′12″N 50°35′00″E to 11°56′42″N 50°39′12″E) and is deposited at The Natural History Museum in London.
