= Calliostoma zietzi =

Scientific classification
- Kingdom: Animalia
- Phylum: Mollusca
- Class: Gastropoda
- Subclass: Vetigastropoda
- Order: Trochida
- Family: Calliostomatidae
- Genus: Calliostoma
- Species: C. zietzi

Binomial name
- Calliostoma zietzi Verco, 1905

Synonyms
- Calliostoma (Fautor) zietzi Verco, 1905

Species of gastropod

Calliostoma zietzi, common name the Zietz top shell, is a species of sea snail, a marine gastropod mollusk in the family Calliostomatidae.

Some authors place this taxon in the subgenus Calliostoma (Fautor) .

== Description ==
The height of the shell attains 8 mm.

== Distribution ==
This marine species occurs off Victoria to Western Australia; off Tasmania.
