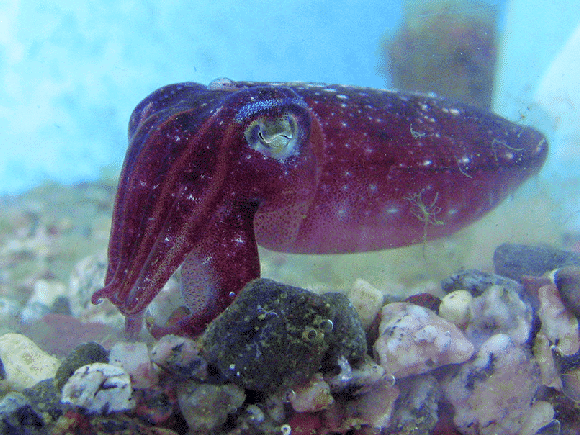

Conservation status
- Data Deficient (IUCN 3.1)

Scientific classification
- Kingdom: Animalia
- Phylum: Mollusca
- Class: Cephalopoda
- Order: Sepiida
- Family: Sepiidae
- Genus: Sepia
- Subgenus: Doratosepion
- Species: S. elongata

Binomial name
- Sepia elongata d'Orbigny, in Férussac & d'Orbigny, 1839–1842

= Sepia elongata =

Species of cuttlefish

Sepia elongata is a species of cuttlefish native to the northwestern Indian Ocean, specifically from the Red Sea to Somalia. The depth range of S. elongata is unknown.

Sepia elongata grows to a mantle length of 97 mm.

The type specimen was collected near Cossier in the Red Sea. It is deposited at the Muséum National d'Histoire Naturelle in Paris.
