= Sepia appelloefi =

Conservation status
- Data Deficient (IUCN 3.1)

Scientific classification
- Kingdom: Animalia
- Phylum: Mollusca
- Class: Cephalopoda
- Order: Sepiida
- Family: Sepiidae
- Genus: Sepia
- Subgenus: Doratosepion
- Species: S. appelloefi

Binomial name
- Sepia appelloefi Wülker, 1910

Species of cuttlefish

Sepia appelloefi is a species of cuttlefish native to the northwestern Pacific Ocean, specifically the Tsushima Strait and waters between Kyūshū and southern Honshū, Japan. It lives at a depth of up to 350 m.

Sepia appelloefi grows to a mantle length of 90 mm.

The type specimen was collected near Misaki, Japan and is deposited at the Zoologische Staatssammlung Muenchen.
