= Sepia subplana =

Conservation status
- Data Deficient (IUCN 3.1)'

Scientific classification
- Kingdom: Animalia
- Phylum: Mollusca
- Class: Cephalopoda
- Order: Sepiida
- Family: Sepiidae
- Genus: Sepia
- Species: S. subplana

Binomial name
- Sepia subplana Lu & Boucher-Rodoni, 2001

Species of cuttlefish

Sepia subplana is a species of cuttlefish native to the southwestern Pacific Ocean. It is known only from the type locality. S. subplana lives at depths of 400 to 600 m.

Size is known only from the type specimens. Females grow to a mantle length (ML) of at least 55 mm. Males grow to at least 60 mm ML.

The type specimens were collected off Bayonnaise Bank in the southwestern Pacific Ocean (11°54′S 179°32′W).
