= Sepia carinata =

Conservation status
- Data Deficient (IUCN 3.1)

Scientific classification
- Kingdom: Animalia
- Phylum: Mollusca
- Class: Cephalopoda
- Order: Sepiida
- Family: Sepiidae
- Genus: Sepia
- Subgenus: Doratosepion
- Species: S. carinata

Binomial name
- Sepia carinata Sasaki, 1920

Species of cuttlefish

Sepia carinata is a species of cuttlefish native to the western Pacific Ocean, specifically southern Japan, Sagami Bay, the South China Sea, and Vietnam. Depth range is lower sublittoral, to 128 m.

Sepia carinata grows to a mantle length of 60 mm.

Reid et al. note that "this is likely to be a very rare species as it has not been recorded from Japanese waters since its original description".

The type specimen was collected in the Sagami Sea, Japan (35°04'50"N 139°38'18"E). It is deposited at the National Museum of Natural History in Washington, D.C.
