= Sepia chirotrema =

Conservation status
- Least Concern (IUCN 3.1)

Scientific classification
- Kingdom: Animalia
- Phylum: Mollusca
- Class: Cephalopoda
- Order: Sepiida
- Family: Sepiidae
- Genus: Sepia
- Subgenus: Sepia
- Species: S. chirotrema

Binomial name
- Sepia chirotrema Berry, 1918

Synonyms
- Solitosepia glauerti Cotton, 1929; Solitosepia hendryae Cotton, 1929

Species of cuttlefish

Sepia chirotrema is a species of cuttlefish native to the southern Indo-Pacific, specifically from Investigator Strait, southern Australia (35°25′S 137°22′E) to Dirk Hartog Island, western Australia (25°45′S 113°03′E). It lives at a depth of between 120 and 210 m.

Sepia chirotrema grows to a mantle length of approximately 200 mm.

The type specimen was collected in the Investigator Strait area (35°25′S 137°22′E), south of Kangaroo Island (35°50′S 137°15′E). It was deposited at the Australian Museum in Sydney but no longer exists.
