= Sepia kiensis =

Conservation status
- Data Deficient (IUCN 3.1)

Scientific classification
- Kingdom: Animalia
- Phylum: Mollusca
- Class: Cephalopoda
- Order: Sepiida
- Family: Sepiidae
- Genus: Sepia
- Subgenus: Doratosepion
- Species: S. kiensis

Binomial name
- Sepia kiensis Hoyle, 1885

Species of cuttlefish

Sepia kiensis is a species of cuttlefish native to the Indo-Pacific, specifically the Kai Islands, possibly to Timor and northern Australia. It lives at depth of 256 m. The validity of S. kiensis has been questioned.

Sepia kiensis grows to a mantle length of 37 mm.

The type specimen was collected off Kai Island in the Arafura Sea. It is deposited at The Natural History Museum in London.
