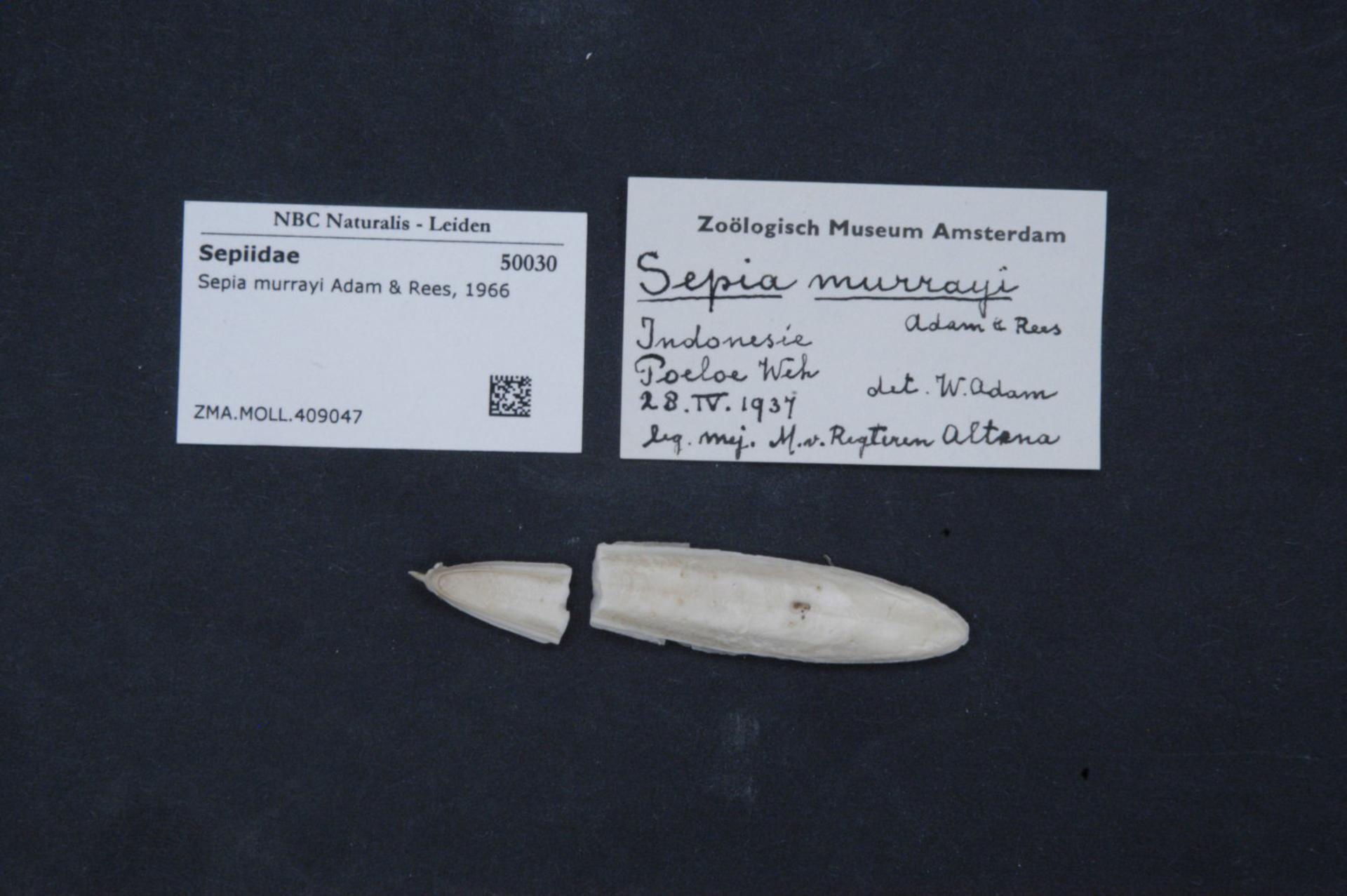

Conservation status
- Data Deficient (IUCN 3.1)

Scientific classification
- Kingdom: Animalia
- Phylum: Mollusca
- Class: Cephalopoda
- Order: Sepiida
- Family: Sepiidae
- Genus: Sepia
- Subgenus: Doratosepion
- Species: S. murrayi

Binomial name
- Sepia murrayi (Adam & Rees, 1966)

= Sepia murrayi =

Species of cuttlefish

Sepia murrayi, also known as the frog cuttlefish, is a species of cuttlefish in the family Sepiidae. The species has been observed in the Indian Ocean, and adults can reach a maximum size of 4.1 centimeters.
