= Sepia reesi =

Conservation status
- Data Deficient (IUCN 3.1)

Scientific classification
- Kingdom: Animalia
- Phylum: Mollusca
- Class: Cephalopoda
- Order: Sepiida
- Family: Sepiidae
- Genus: Sepia
- Subgenus: Rhombosepion
- Species: S. reesi

Binomial name
- Sepia reesi Adam, 1979

Synonyms
- Rhombosepion hieronis Robson, 1924

Species of cuttlefish

Sepia reesi is a species of cuttlefish native to the southeastern Indian Ocean. Cuttlebone of this species known only from the type locality.

Sepia reesi grows to a mantle length of 45 mm.

Sepia reesi was only known from the type specimen was collected in Salmon Bay, Rottnest Island, Western Australia but a complete specimen was collected west of Rottnest Island (32º00'S 115º15'E) at a depth of 146-150m. Both the type specimen and the more recent specimen are deposited at the Western Australian Museum in Perth.

The specific epithet reesi honours British researcher William James Rees.
