= Sepia limata =

Conservation status
- Least Concern (IUCN 3.1)

Scientific classification
- Kingdom: Animalia
- Phylum: Mollusca
- Class: Cephalopoda
- Order: Sepiida
- Family: Sepiidae
- Genus: Sepia
- Subgenus: Doratosepion
- Species: S. limata

Binomial name
- Sepia limata (Iredale, 1926)

Synonyms
- Arctosepia limata Iredale, 1926

Species of cuttlefish

Sepia limata is a species of cuttlefish native to the southwestern Pacific Ocean, specifically southern Queensland to New South Wales, Australia (26°30′S 153°44′E to 34°40′S 150°51′E). It lives at depths of between 17–183 metres (56–600 ft).

Females are slightly larger than males. They grow to a mantle length of 42 millimetres (1.7 in) and 35 millimetres (1.4 in), respectively.

The type specimen was collected off Manly Beach, New South Wales (33°48′S 151°17′E). It is deposited at the Australian Museum in Sydney.
