= Sepia rhoda =

Conservation status
- Least Concern (IUCN 3.1)

Scientific classification
- Kingdom: Animalia
- Phylum: Mollusca
- Class: Cephalopoda
- Order: Sepiida
- Family: Sepiidae
- Genus: Sepia
- Subgenus: Doratosepion
- Species: S. rhoda

Binomial name
- Sepia rhoda (Iredale, 1954)

Synonyms
- Arctosepia rhoda Iredale, 1954

Species of cuttlefish

Sepia rhoda is a species of cuttlefish native to the Indo-Pacific, specifically from the Arafura Sea (10°24′S 130°23′E) to the North West Shelf (20°47′S 114°48′E), both off Australia. It lives at depths of between 64 and 184 m.

Females grow to 58 mm in mantle length (ML). Males are slightly larger, reaching 61 mm ML.

The type specimen was collected off Point Cloates in Western Australia (22°43′S 113°40′E). It is deposited at the Australian Museum in Sydney.
