= Sepia cottoni =

Conservation status
- Least Concern (IUCN 3.1)

Scientific classification
- Kingdom: Animalia
- Phylum: Mollusca
- Class: Cephalopoda
- Order: Sepiida
- Family: Sepiidae
- Genus: Sepia
- Subgenus: Doratosepion
- Species: S. cottoni

Binomial name
- Sepia cottoni Adam, 1979

Species of cuttlefish

Sepia cottoni is a species of cuttlefish native to the southeastern Indian Ocean, specifically from northwest of Broome (17°31' S) to Armstrong Point, Rottnest Island (32°0' S). It lives at a depth of between 83 and 183 m.

Sepia cottoni grows to a mantle length of 55 mm.

The type specimen was collected west of Lancelin, Australia (31°54′S 114°55′E). It is deposited at the Western Australian Museum in Perth.
