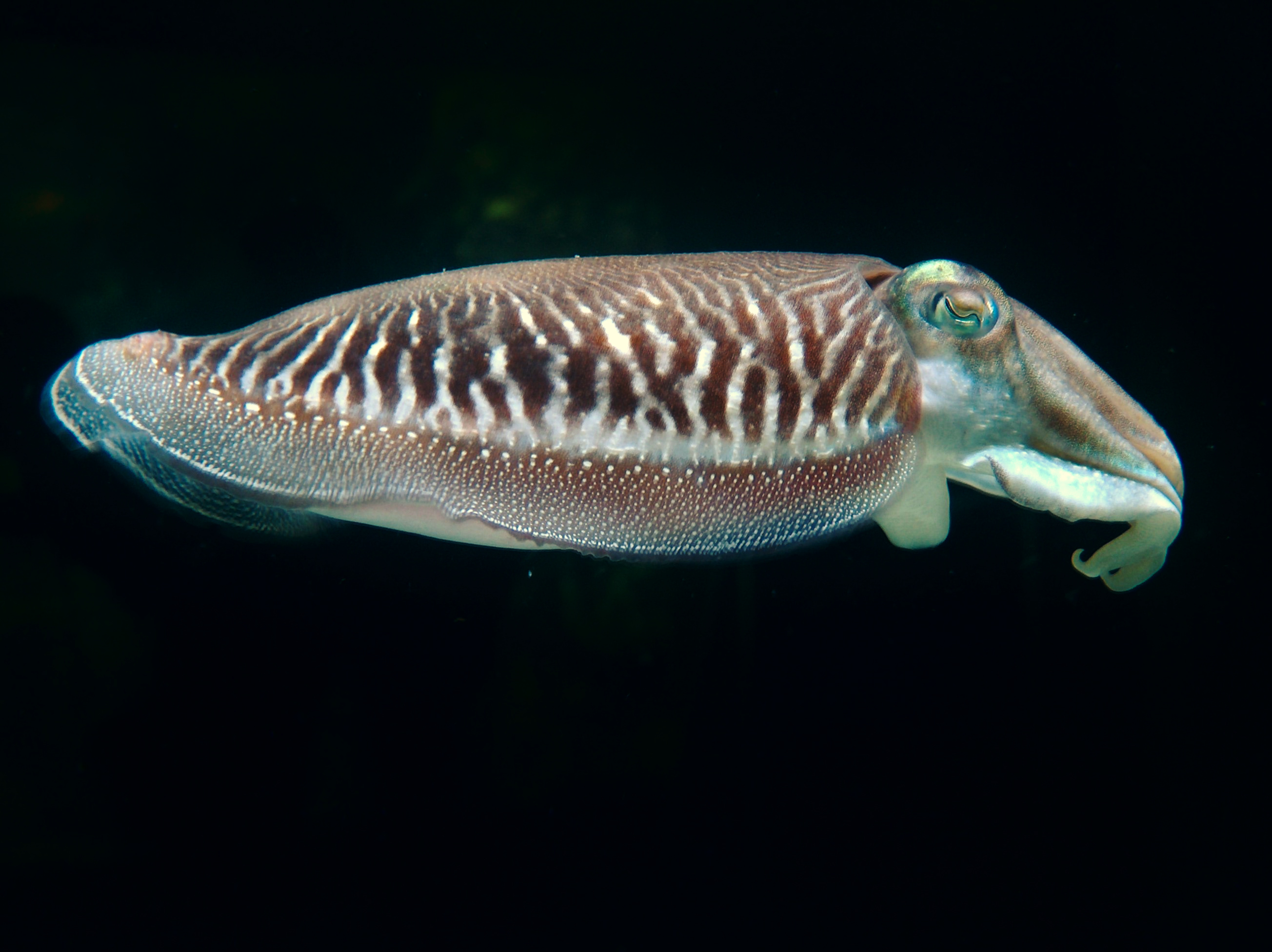
- Common cuttlefish, Sepia officinalis

Scientific classification
- Kingdom: Animalia
- Phylum: Mollusca
- Class: Cephalopoda
- Order: Sepiida
- Family: Sepiidae
- Genus: Sepia; Linnaeus, 1758

Type species
- Sepia officinalis Linnaeus, 1758

= Sepia (cephalopod) =

Sepia Temporal range: Miocene – Recent

Genus of cephalopods

Sepia is a genus of cuttlefish in the family Sepiidae encompassing some of the best known and most common species. The cuttlebone is ellipsoid in shape. The name of the genus is the Latinised form of the Ancient Greek σηπία (sēpía) "cuttlefish".

== Anatomy ==
All members of Sepia possess eight arms and two tentacles. Tentacles are retractable limbs used to target and latch onto prey, whereas arms are used for handling prey and producing patterns of light and dark to distract prey. Once a prey item has been caught, the tentacles detach from it and have no other function. The tentacles reside in sheaths that run below the eyes and behind the head, into the visceral mass, where they are reserved as coiled, spring-loaded appendages, waiting to be ejected towards a food target.

== Classification ==
A 2023 paper extensively revised the composition of genus Sepia; As a consequence, many species have been split out of genus Sepia, assigned to revived genera or elevated subgenera. Currently, the genus has 58 species, according to WoRMS. A number of these species need further verification, but they are listed below:

- Sepia acuminata E. A. Smith, 1916
- Sepia adami Roeleveld, 1972
- Sepia appelloefi Wülker, 1910
- Sepia aureomaculata Okutani & Horikawa, 1987
- Sepia bathyalis Khromov, Nikitina & Nesis, 1991
- Sepia bertheloti d'Orbigny, 1835, African cuttlefish
- Sepia bidhaia A. Reid, 2000
- Sepia brevimana Steenstrup, 1875
- Sepia burnupi Hoyle, 1904
- Sepia carinata Sasaki, 1920
- Sepia chirotrema S. S. Berry, 1918
- Sepia confusa E. A. Smith, 1916
- Sepia cottoni Adam, 1979
- Sepia dollfusi Adam, 1941
- Sepia elobyana Adam, 1941, Guinean cuttlefish
- Sepia elongata A. d'Orbigny, 1842
- Sepia furcata Ho & Lu, 2005
- Sepia gibba Ehrenberg, 1831
- Sepia grahami A. Reid, 2001
- Sepia hierredda Rang, 1835, giant African cuttlefish *
- Sepia hirunda Ho & Lu, 2005
- Sepia incerta E. A. Smith, 1916
- Sepia insignis E. A. Smith, 1916
- Sepia irvingi W. T. Meyer, 1909
- Sepia ivanovi Khromov, 1982
- Sepia joubini Massy, 1927
- Sepia kiensis Hoyle, 1885
- Sepia koilados A. Reid, 2000
- Sepia mascarensis Filippova & Khromov, 1991
- Sepia mira (Cotton, 1932)
- Sepia mirabilis Khromov, 1988
- Sepia murrayi Adam & Rees, 1966, frog cuttlefish
- Sepia officinalis Linnaeus, 1758, common cuttlefish *
- Sepia plana Lu & A. Reid, 1997
- Sepia plathyconchalis Filippova & Khromov, 1991
- Sepia prabahari Neethiselvan & Venkataramani, 2002
- Sepia pulchra Roeleveld & Liltved, 1985
- Sepia reesi Adam, 1979
- Sepia rhoda (Iredale, 1954)
- Sepia savignyi Blainville, 1827
- Sepia saya Khromov, Nikitina & Nesis, 1991
- Sepia senta Lu & A. Reid, 1997
- Sepia sewelli Adam & Rees, 1966
- Sepia simoniana Thiele, 1920
- Sepia sokotriensis Khromov, 1988
- Sepia subplana Lu & Boucher-Rodoni, 2001
- Sepia subtenuipes Okutani & Horikawa, 1987
- Sepia sulcata Hoyle, 1885, grooved cuttlefish
- Sepia tala Khromov, Nikitina & Nesis, 1991
- Sepia tanybracheia A. Reid, 2000
- Sepia thurstoni Adam & Rees, 1966
- Sepia tuberculata Lamarck, 1798
- Sepia vecchioni Neethiselvan & Venkataramani, 2010
- Sepia vercoi Adam, 1979
- Sepia vermiculata Quoy & Gaimard, 1832 *
- Sepia vietnamica Khromov, 1987
- Sepia vossi Khromov, 1996
- Sepia zanzibarica Pfeffer, 1884

The species marked with an asterisk (*) were examined in the 2023 paper.

=== Extinct species ===
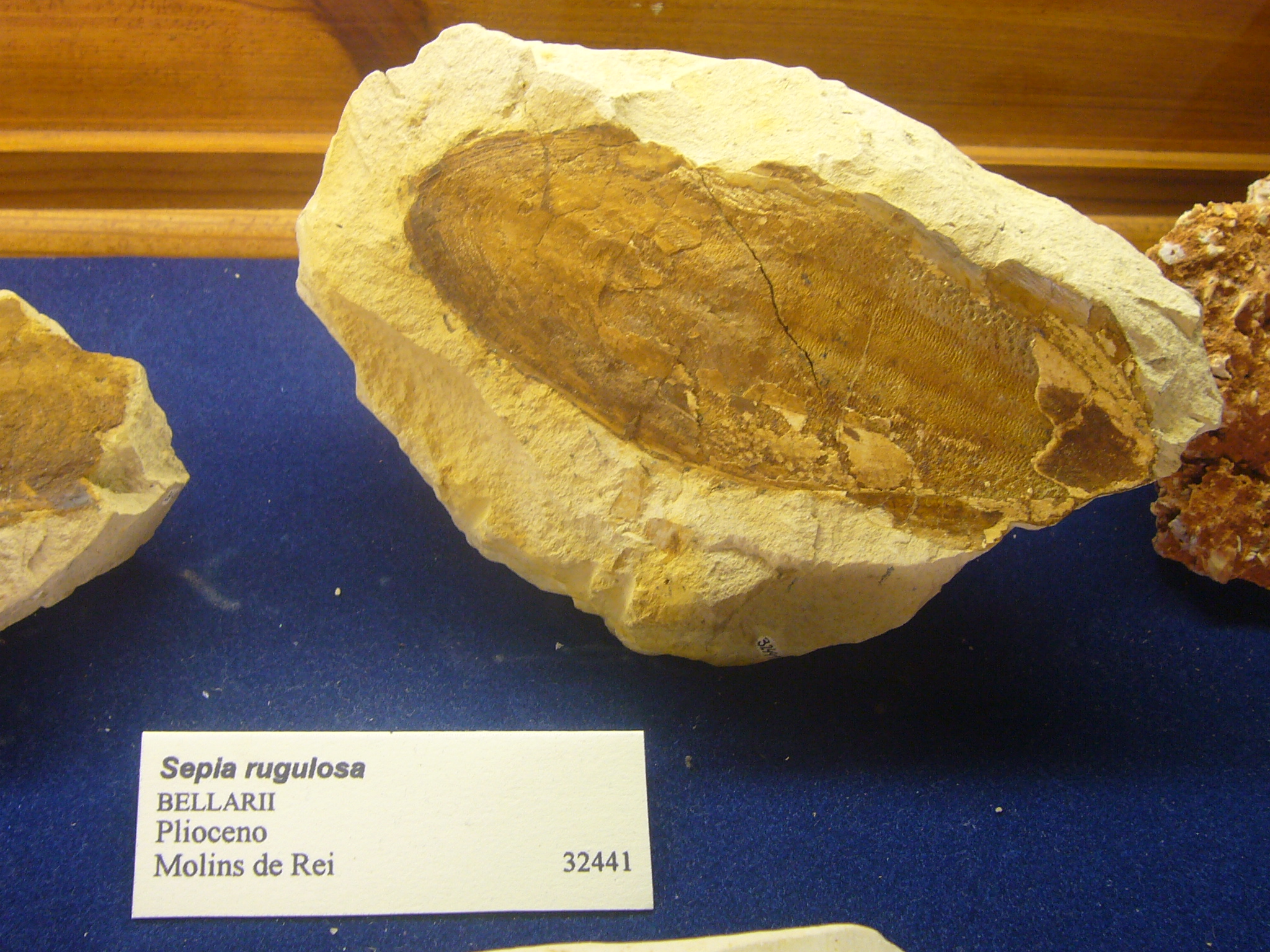
Fossil cuttlebone of the Pliocene species Sepia rugulosa

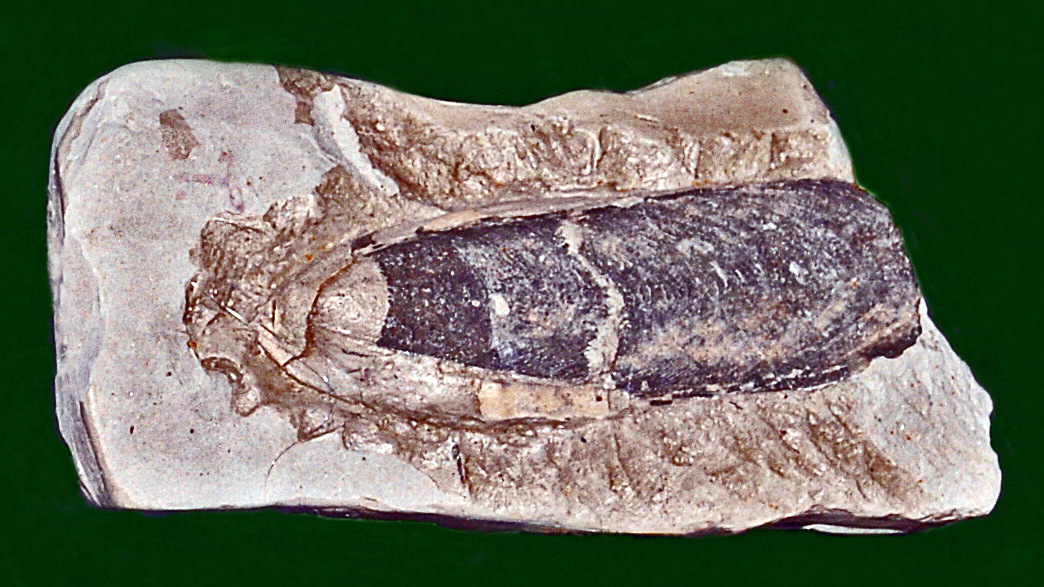
Fossil cuttlebone of Sepia stricta

A number of extinct species have been described from the Neogene of Europe, though many of these are likely synonyms. They include:

- Sepia bertii Foresti, 1890
- Sepia complanata Bellardi, 1872
- Sepia craversii Gastaldi, 1868
- Sepia gastaldii Bellardi, 1872
- Sepia granosa Bellardi, 1872
- Sepia harmati Szörenyi, 1933
- Sepia hungarica Lörenthey, 1898
- Sepia isseli Bellardi, 1872
- Sepia michelotti Gastaldi, 1868
- Sepia rugulosa Bellardi, 1872
- Sepia stricta Bellardi, 1872
- Sepia verrucosa Bellardi, 1872
- Sepia vindobonensis Schloenbach, 1869
