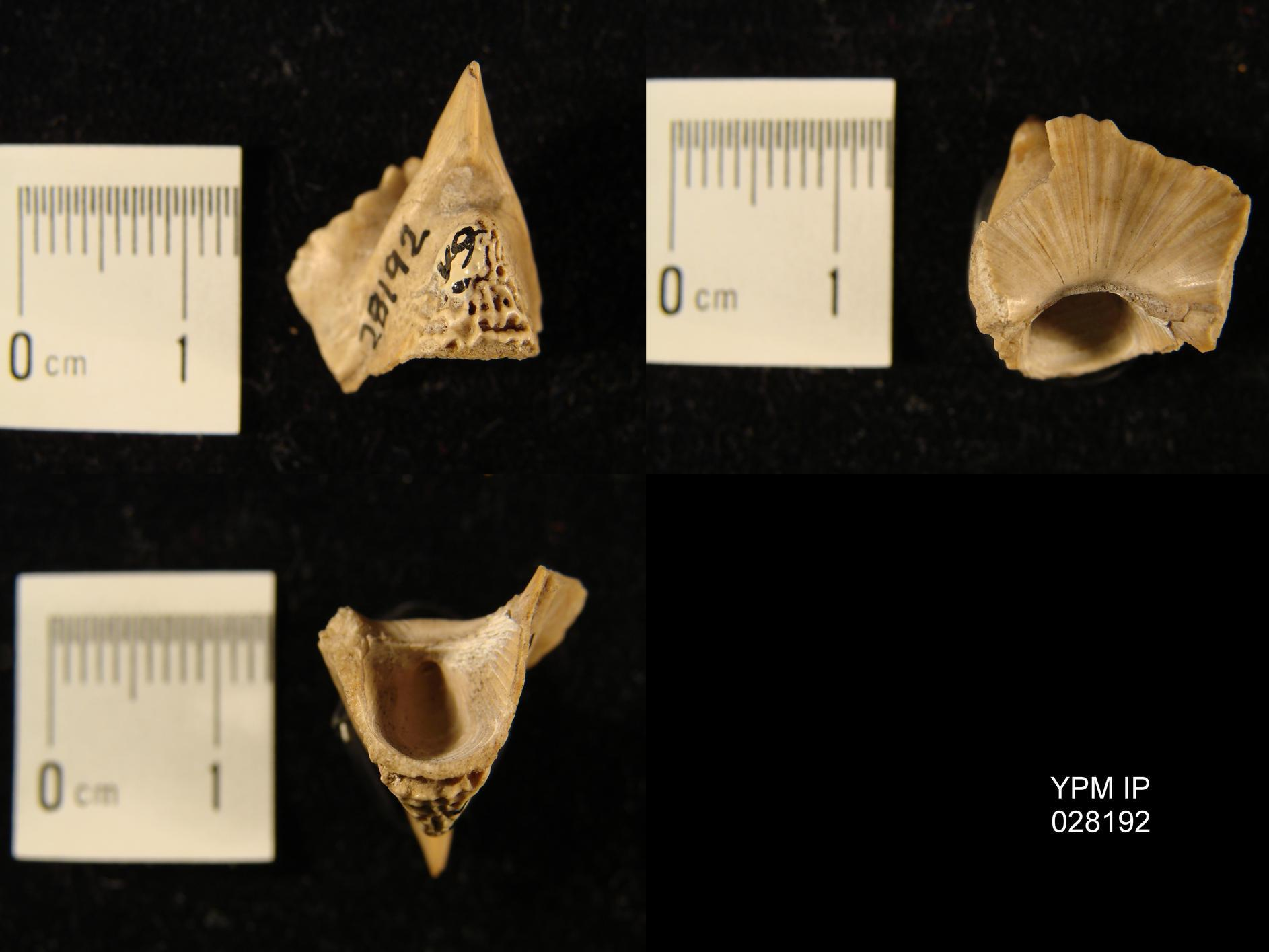
- Belosepia sepioidea

Scientific classification
- Kingdom: Animalia
- Phylum: Mollusca
- Class: Cephalopoda
- Order: Sepiida
- Suborder: Sepiina
- Family: †Belosaepiidae

Genera
- †Aegyptosaepia Košťák, Jagt, Speijer, Stassen & Steurbaut, 2013; †Belosaepia Voltz, 1830; †Ceratisepia Meyer, 1993; †Pseudosepia Naef, 1923

= Belosaepiidae =

Belosaepiidae Temporal range: Eocene

Extinct family of molluscs

Belosaepiidae is an extinct family of cephalopods known from the Eocene epoch, and bearing close similarity to the sepiid cuttlefish, whilst retaining the remnants of a belemnite-like guard.

== Ecology ==
A faunal collection has been found that contains species of both Belosaepiidae and Sepiidae, suggesting that they are likely to have originated from a seagrass environment in the past. As there was a lack of seagrass in the North Atlantic during the late Eocene period, at least one belosaepiid species went extinct during this time.
