= Sepia vercoi =

Conservation status
- Least Concern (IUCN 3.1)

Scientific classification
- Kingdom: Animalia
- Phylum: Mollusca
- Class: Cephalopoda
- Order: Sepiida
- Family: Sepiidae
- Genus: Sepia
- Subgenus: Doratosepion
- Species: S. vercoi

Binomial name
- Sepia vercoi Adam, 1979

Species of cuttlefish

Sepia vercoi is a species of cuttlefish native to the southeastern Indian Ocean, specifically the waters off Western Australia (18°31′S 118°09′E to 25°31′S 112°29′E). It lives at depths of 76 to 201 m.

Both sexes of S. vercoi grow to 46 mm in mantle length.

The type specimen was collected west of Shark Bay, Western Australia (25°31′S 112°29′E). It is deposited at the Western Australian Museum in Perth.
