= Sepiola knudseni =

Conservation status
- Data Deficient (IUCN 3.1)

Scientific classification
- Kingdom: Animalia
- Phylum: Mollusca
- Class: Cephalopoda
- Order: Sepiolida
- Family: Sepiolidae
- Subfamily: Sepiolinae
- Genus: Sepiola
- Species: S. knudseni

Binomial name
- Sepiola knudseni Adam, 1983

Species of mollusc

Sepiola knudseni is a species of bobtail squid native to the eastern Atlantic Ocean, specifically northwest and west Africa, from the Canary Islands to the Gulf of Guinea. It lives on the inner continental shelf. S. knudseni lives at depths of 32 to 90 m.

Females of this species are on average considerably larger than males. They grow to 18 mm and 8.5 mm in mantle length, respectively.

The type specimen was collected in the Atlantic Ocean (06°17′N 03°27′E) and is deposited at the Zoologisk Museum of the Kobenhavns Universitet in Copenhagen.
