= Belosepiella =

Belosepiella Temporal range: Late Eocene (Bartonian)

Scientific classification
- Kingdom: Animalia
- Phylum: Mollusca
- Class: Cephalopoda
- Order: Sepiida
- Suborder: Sepiina
- Superfamily: †Vasseurioidea
- Family: †Belosepiellidae; Naef, 1921
- Genus: †Belosepiella de Alessandri, 1905

Species
- †Belosepiella cossmanni de Alessandri, 1905; †Belosepiella parisiensis de Alessandri, 1905

Extinct genus of molluscs

Belosepiella is an extinct genus of cephalopods, including just two species. It is the only genus in the monotypic family Belosepiellidae.
