= William Adam (malacologist) =

Belgian malacologist

William Adam (27 January 1909 – 3 November 1988) was a Dutch–Belgian malacologist who specialised in cephalopods. Adam described a number of cuttlefish and bobtail squid species, including Euprymna hoylei, Sepia cottoni, Sepia dollfusi, Sepia dubia, Sepia reesi, Sepia sewelli, Sepia thurstoni, Sepia vercoi, and Sepiola knudseni.

Adam was born in The Hague, the son of Constance Jeannette Barkhuijsen and the merchant sailor William Adam. After his schooling in The Hague he visited Java in 1926-27. Upon his return home he studied biology at Utrecht University, obtaining his PhD in 1933 with a dissertation on terrestrial mollusk glands. He then took a position at the Museum of Natural Sciences in Brussels, where he climbed the ranks. In 1952 he became a Belgian citizen. In 1957 Adam became correspondent of the Royal Netherlands Academy of Arts and Sciences.

Adam died in Brussels on 3 November 1988 at the age of 79.
