= Joseph Verco =

Australian physician and conchologist (1851–1933)

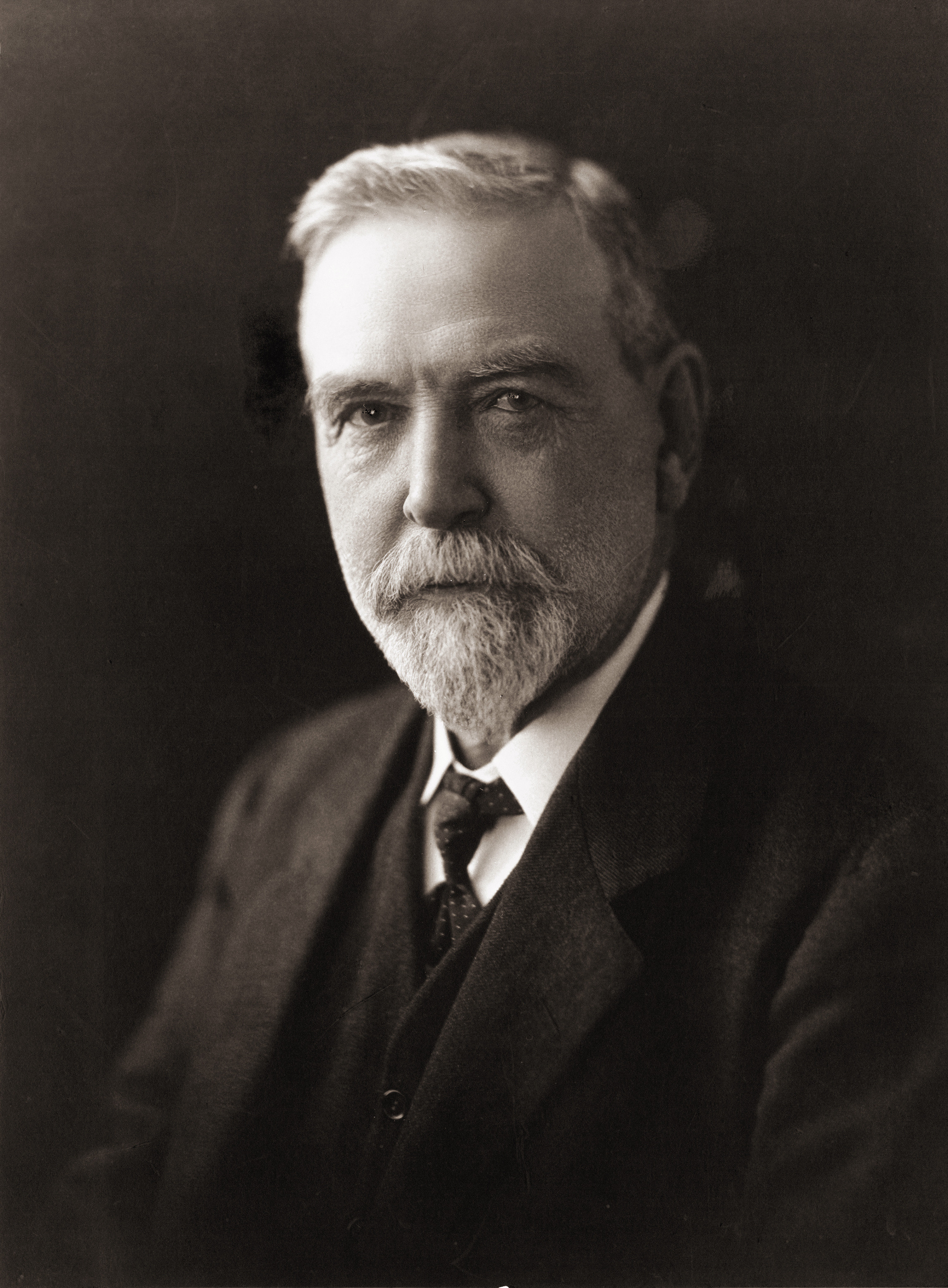
Sir Joseph Cooke Verco (1919)

Sir Joseph Cooke Verco (1 August 1851 – 26 July 1933) was an Australian physician and conchologist.

Born in Australia to British-born parents, Verco studied for a year St Peter's College, Adelaide, before going on to study medicine at the University of London. He returned to Australia in 1878, where he worked as a physician, lecturer at the University of Adelaide, and president of the South Australian branch of the British Medical Association. Verco retired from medical work in 1919, and that same year was knighted and appointed Dean of the Faculty of Medicine at Adelaide. He was later appointed the Dean of the Faculty of Dentistry.

Outside of medicine, Verco collaborated with Charles Hedley and Professor William A. Haswell in investigating South Australia's continental shelf. His work as a taxonomist included the description of Sepia braggi, the slender cuttlefish. The database WoRMS contains 150 marine species named by J. C. Verco, many of which have become synonyms. He was mentor to Bernard Charles Cotton, who served as the South Australian Museum's Curator of Molluscs from 1934 to 1962.

The Verco Medal is the highest award granted by the Royal Society of South Australia.

The Verco Building at Minda Home (built in 1914) is named for him.
