= North West Shelf =

Area off the coast of Western Australia

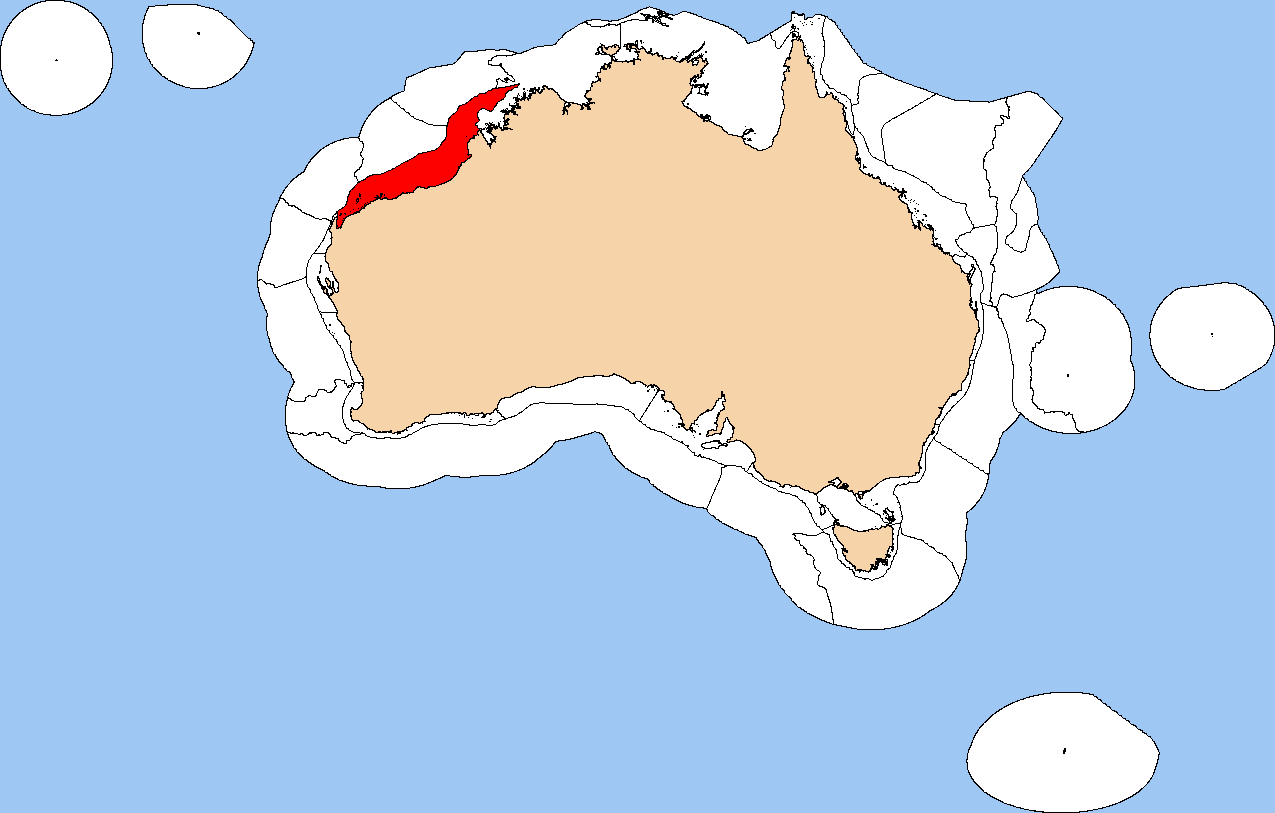
The Northwest Shelf marine province, as defined by the Integrated Marine and Coastal Regionalisation of Australia (ICMRA), contains the North West Shelf region.

The North West Shelf is a continental shelf region of Western Australia. It includes an extensive oil and gas region off the North West Australia coast in the Pilbara region.

== Geology ==
Considerable parts of the region are the highest prospective gas and oil areas of Australia. The main sedimentary basin providing the opportunity is the Northern Carnarvon Basin – however it is only one part of the regional complex.

== Oil and gas ==
It has a considerable number of oil and gas wells, pipelines, production areas and support facilities.

=== Location ===
As an area it is located in the Indian Ocean between North West Cape and Dampier. Dampier is usually considered the main administrative locality for the shelf.

=== Production areas ===
The production areas are located offshore and within the jurisdiction of the Western Australian state government.

The two main production areas are the Thevenard Production Area close to Onslow, and the Varanus Production Area west of Dampier.

=== Oil fields ===
The North West Shelf oil extraction is negligible compared to the volume of gas produced.

=== Gas project ===
North West Shelf Venture leases and infrastructure

The North West Shelf Venture is a project to extract resources within the region from various gas fields – however it is considered to be only in part of the whole shelf region. It involves developments on the Burrup Peninsula, Barrow Island and other locations.

== See also ==
- Regions of Western Australia
