= Zoological Museum (Saint Petersburg) =

Zoological museum in Saint Petersburg, Russia

Zoological Museum of the Zoological Institute of the Russian Academy of Sciences
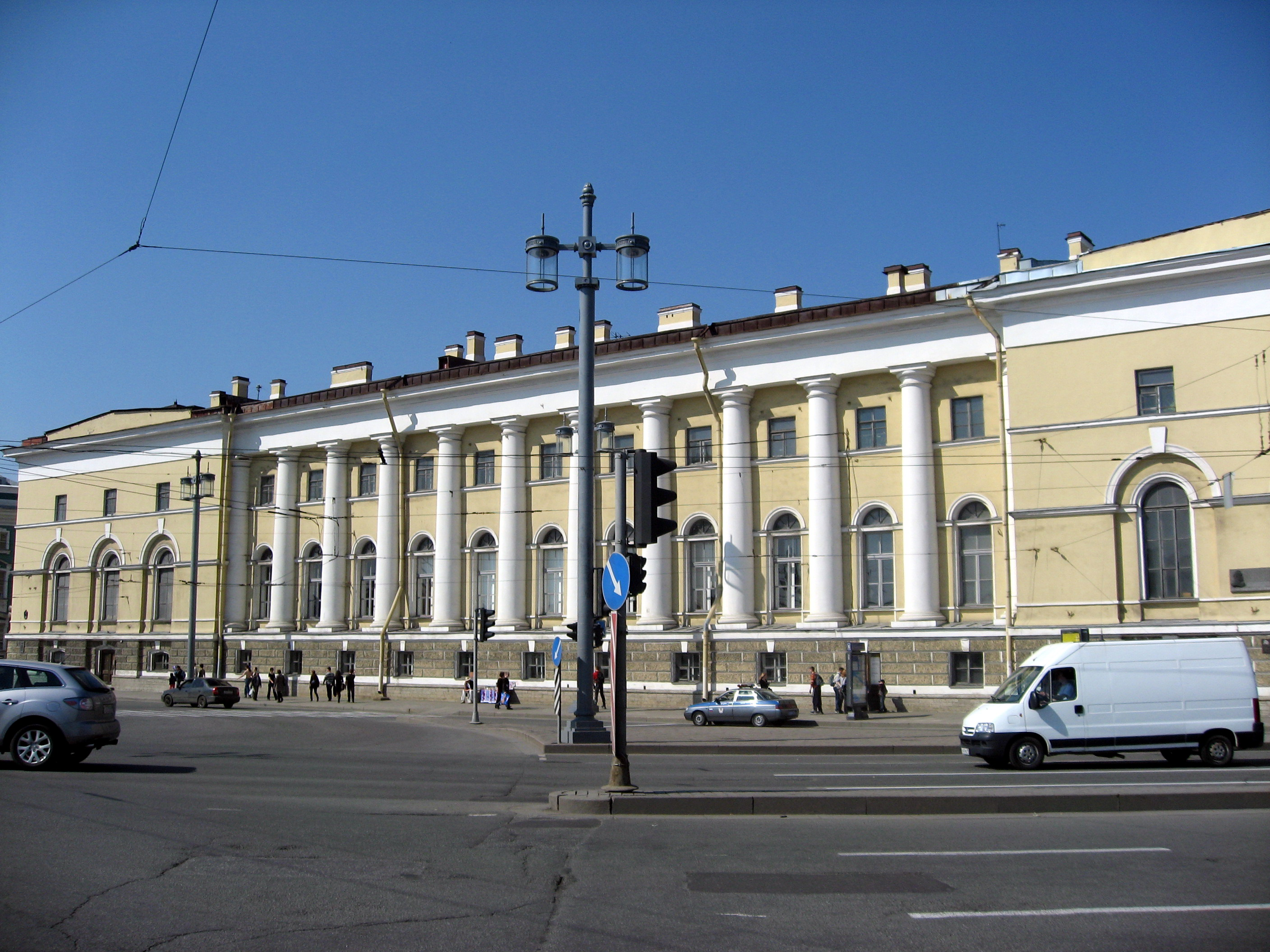
- The museum building
- Established: 1931
- Location: Saint Petersburg, Russia
- Coordinates: 59°56′32.54″N 30°18′19.64″E
- Website: Official Site (in Russian)

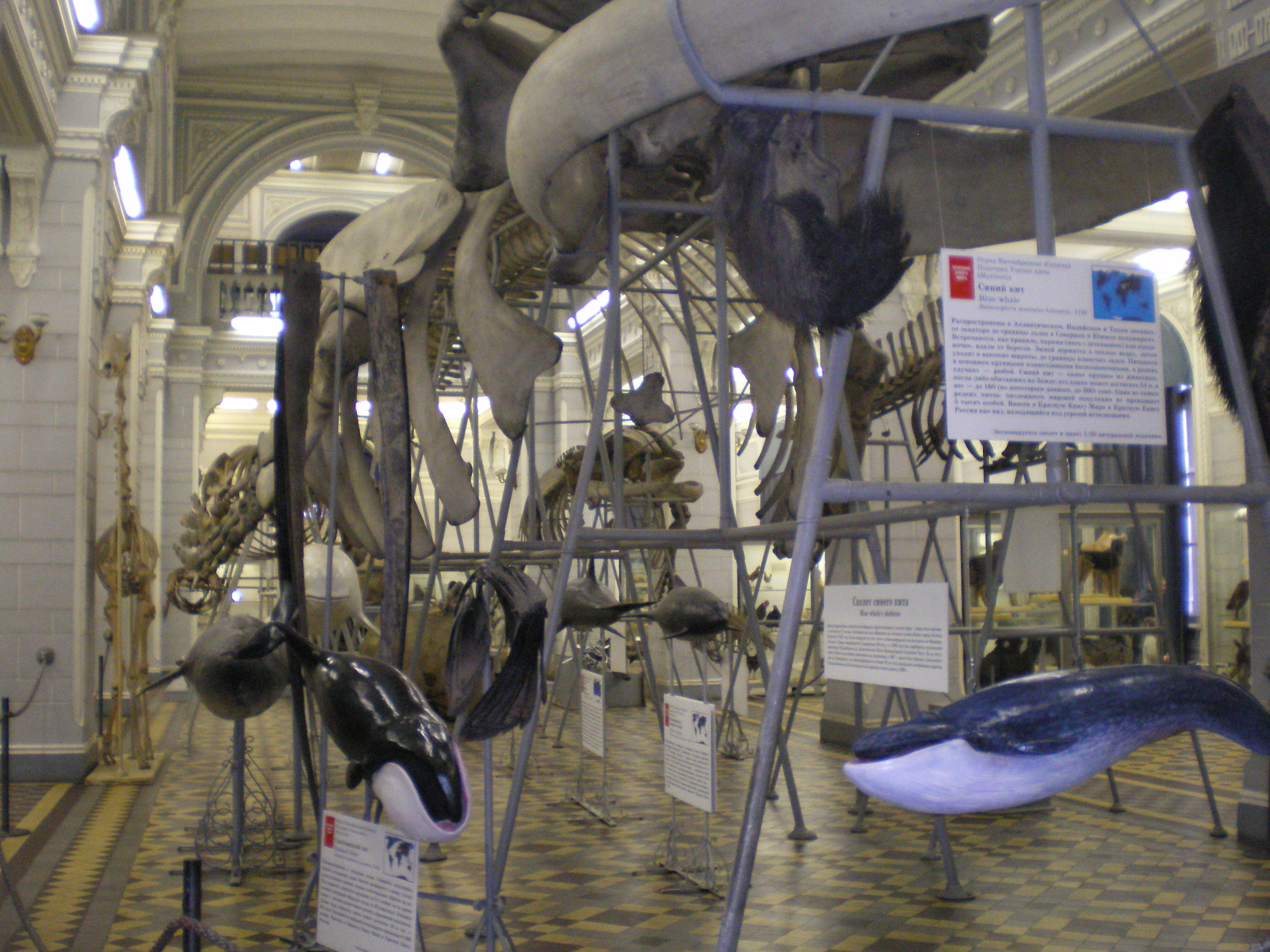
The first hall, marine mammals

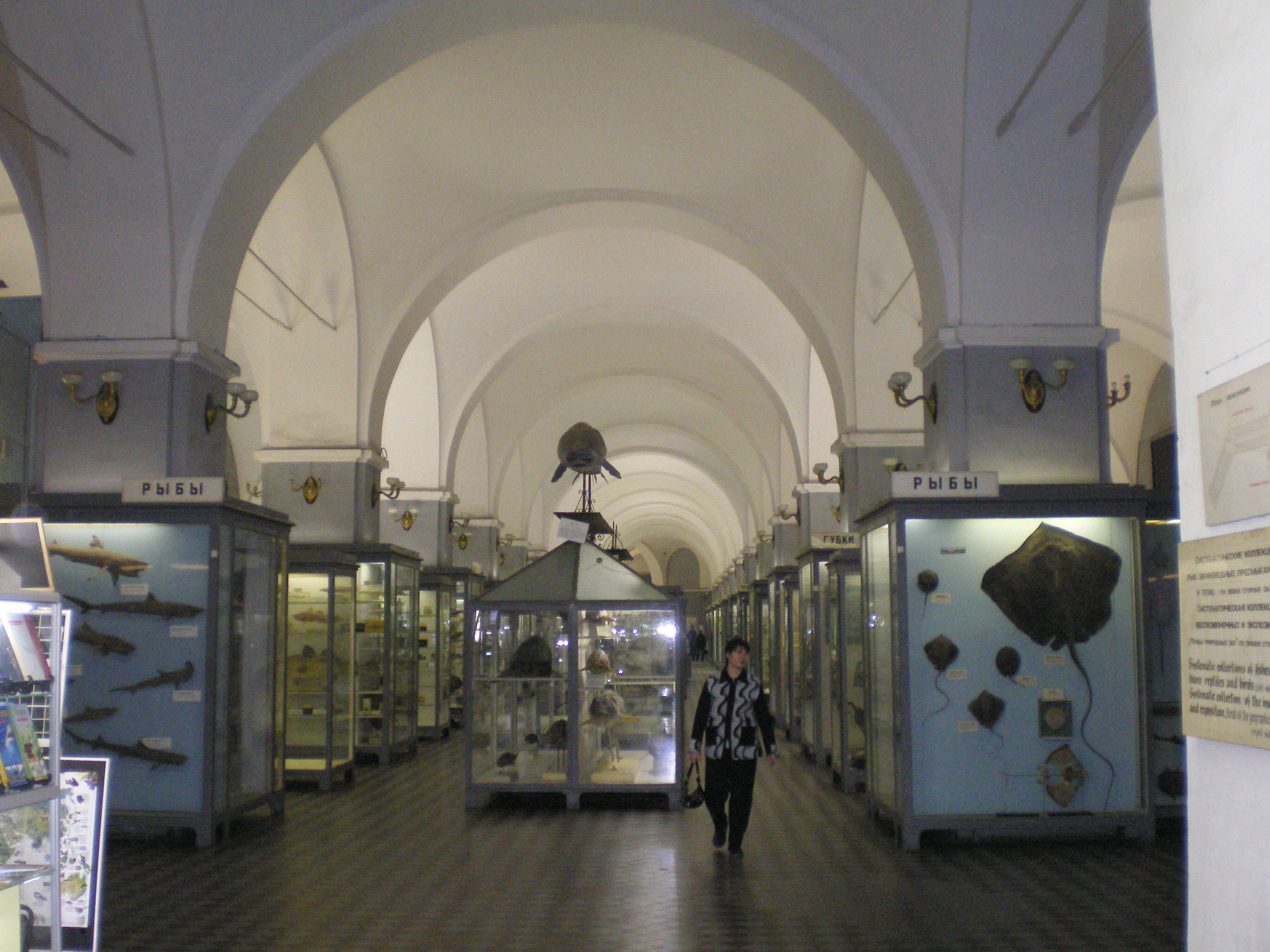
The second hall, fishes

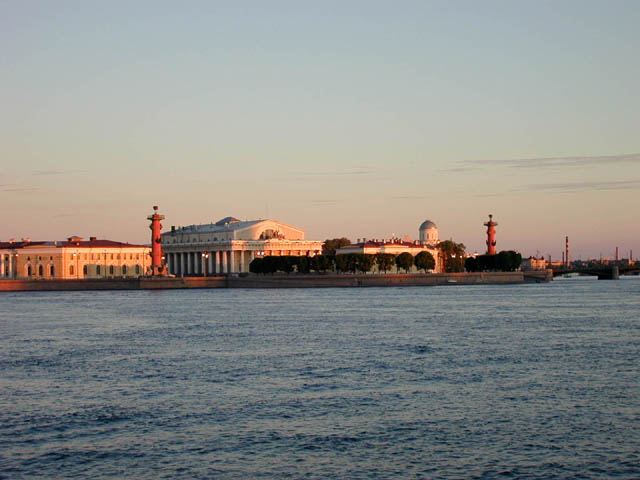
The southern warehouse is in the left

The Zoological Museum of the Zoological Institute of the Russian Academy of Sciences is a Russian museum devoted to zoology. It is located in Saint Petersburg, on Universitetskaya Embankment. It is one of the ten largest nature history museums in the world.

Peter the Great's Kunstkamera collections included zoological specimens. In 1724, the museum became a part of the Russian Academy of Sciences. A printed catalogue of the contents was published in 1742. It listed the zoology, botany, geology and anthropology specimens and contained an album of etchings of the building and plan of some of its parts.

In 1766, Peter Simon Pallas, a member of the Russian Academy of Sciences, was appointed curator of Zoology. In 1832, the zoological collection was split from the Kunstkamera and, in 1896, moved nearby to its present location in the former southern warehouse of the Saint Petersburg bourse (constructed in 1826-1832). In 1931, the Zoological Institute was established within the Academy of Sciences, which included the museum.

In the front hall of the museum is a monument to Karl Ernst von Baer by the entrance, as well as skeletons of cetaceans, including the enormous 27-metre-long (89 ft) blue whale, and mounted pinnipeds. In the gallery above the front hall, the entomological collection is displayed. The second and third halls form a long passage with systematic collections and dioramas dating back to the early 20th century. The second hall hosts the collection of fishes, amphibians, reptiles, birds and invertebrates, mounted or preserved in formalin, and their skeletons or shells. The collection of mammals, including woolly mammoths, is displayed in the third hall.

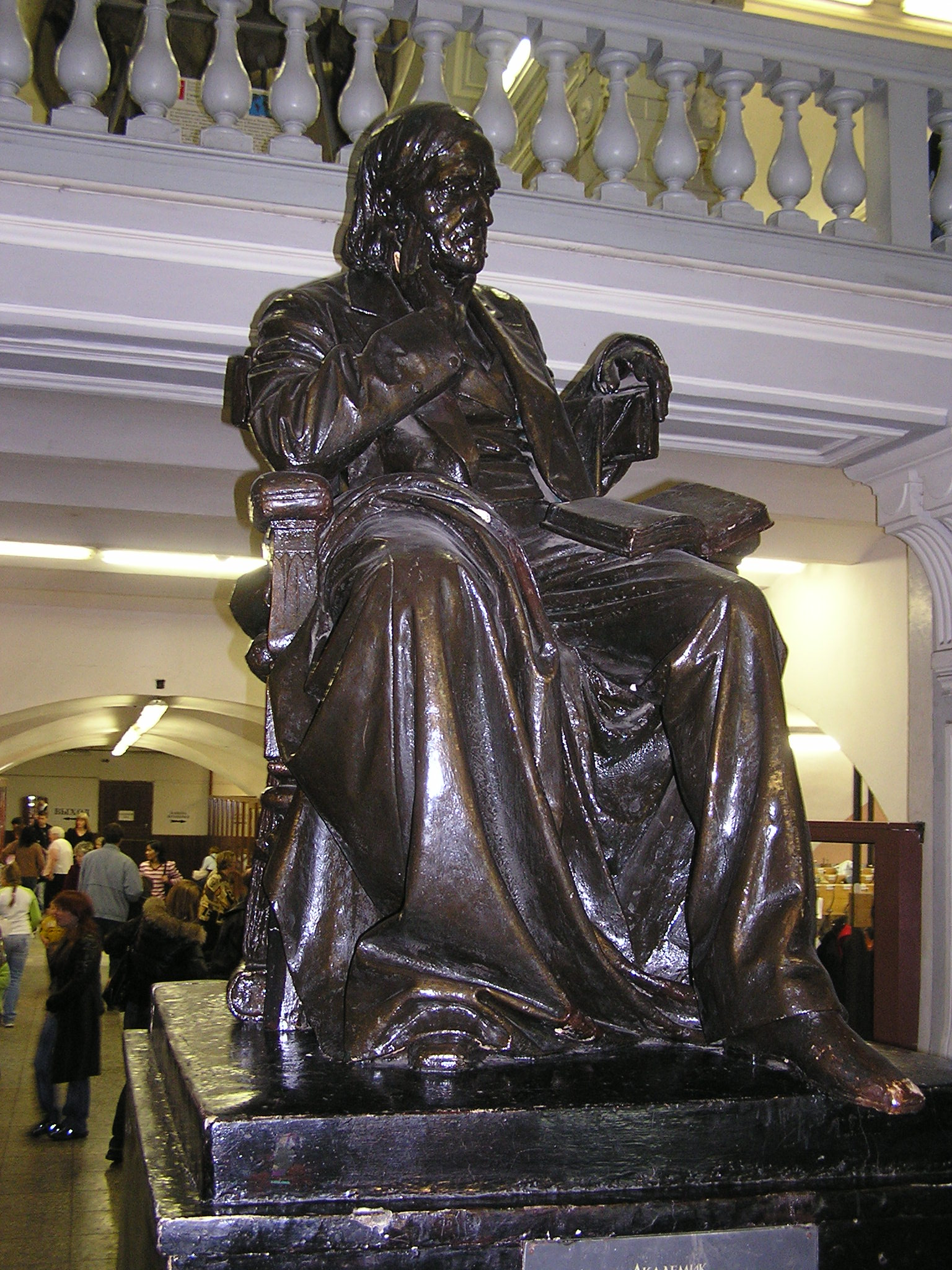
Karl Ernst von Baer

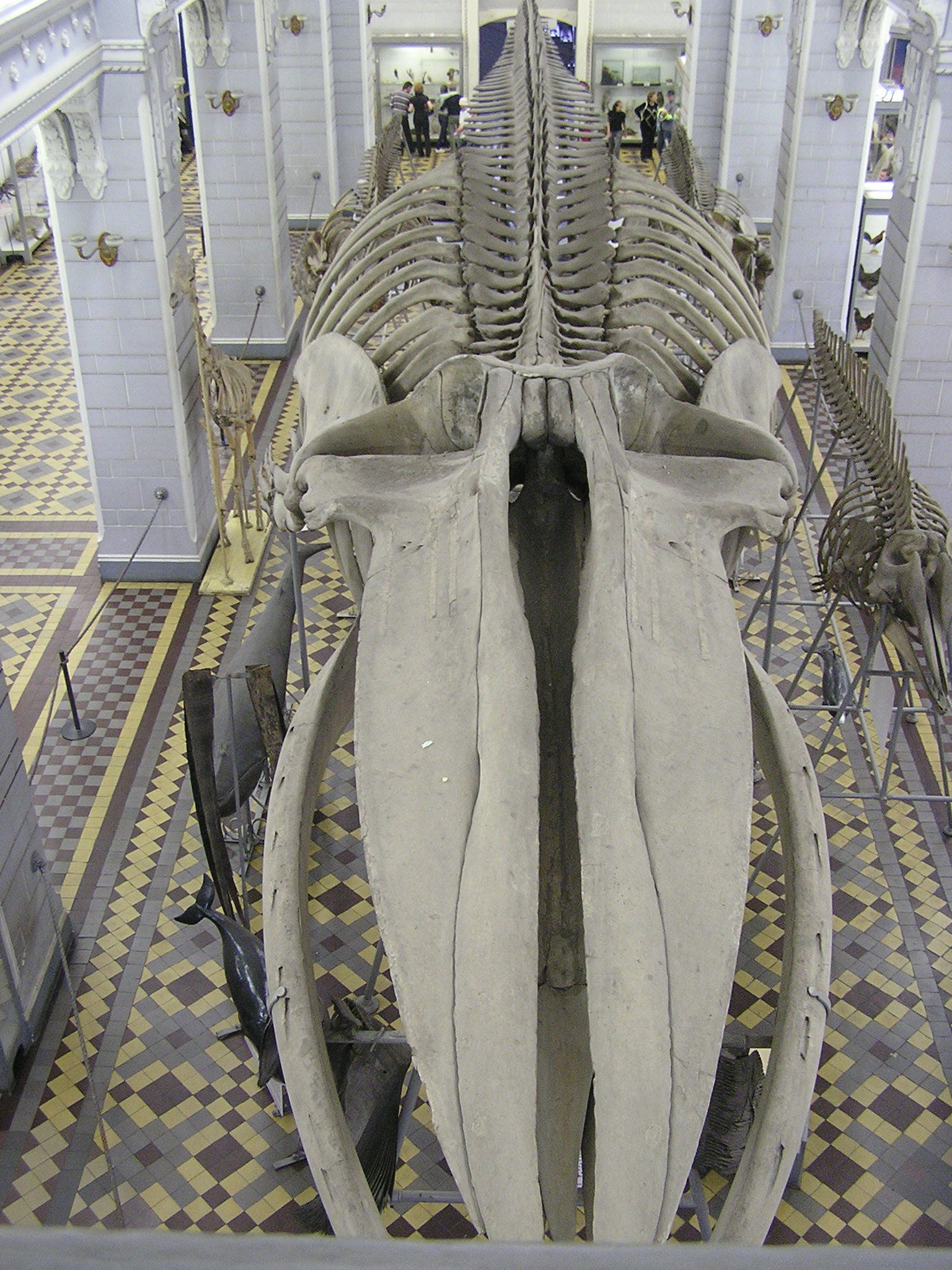
The enormous skeleton of a blue whale

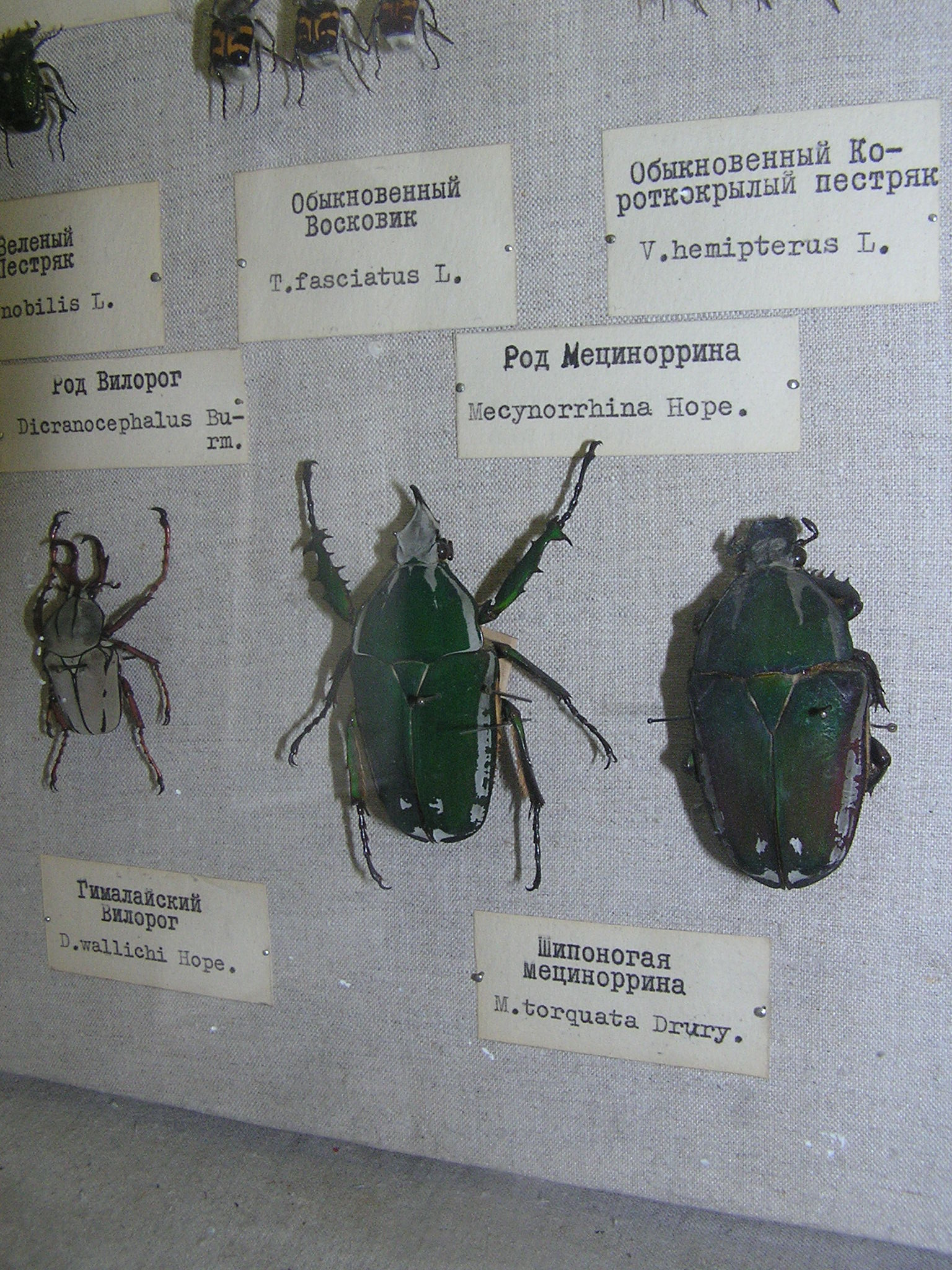
Entomological collection

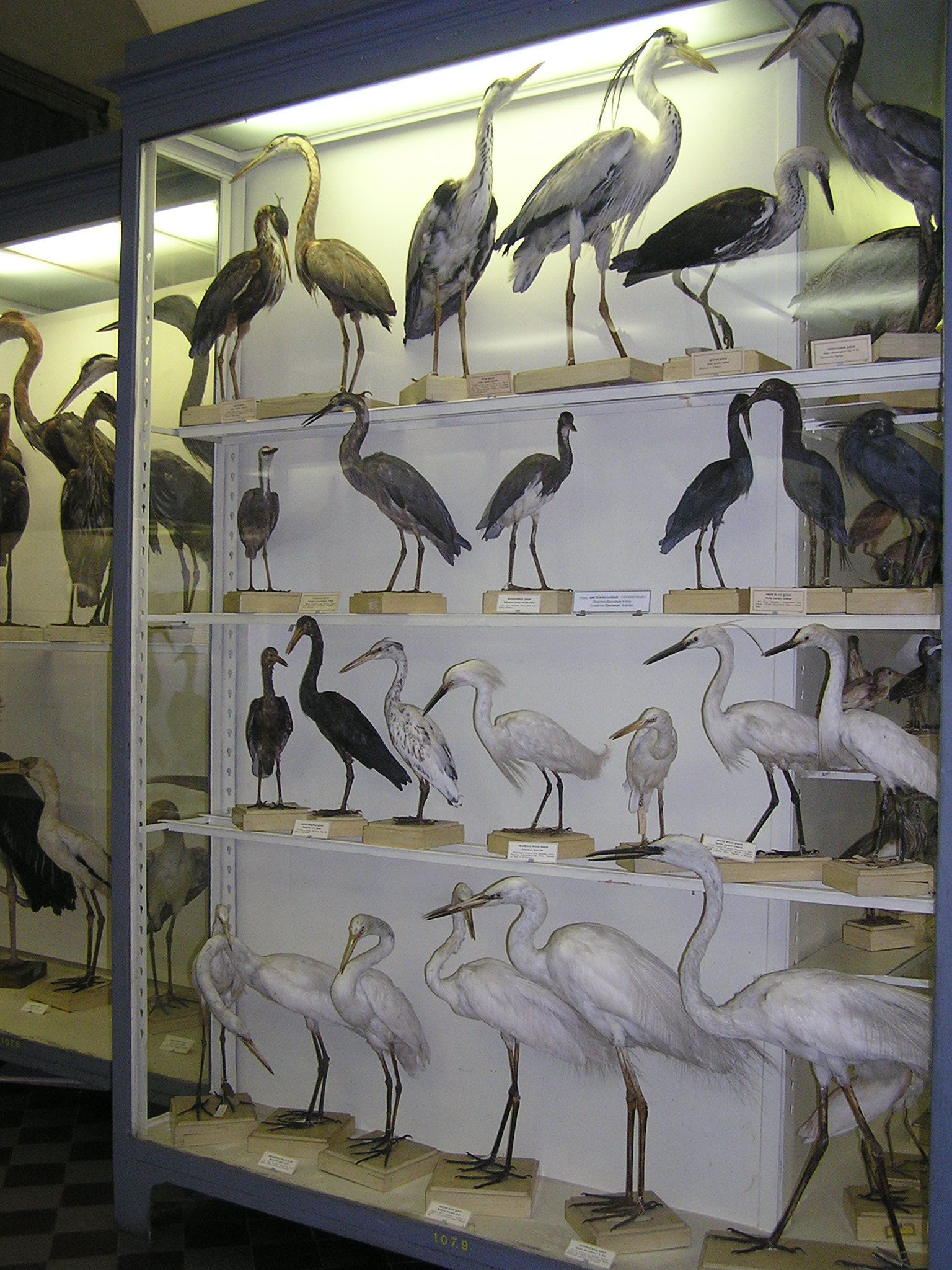
Mounted herons

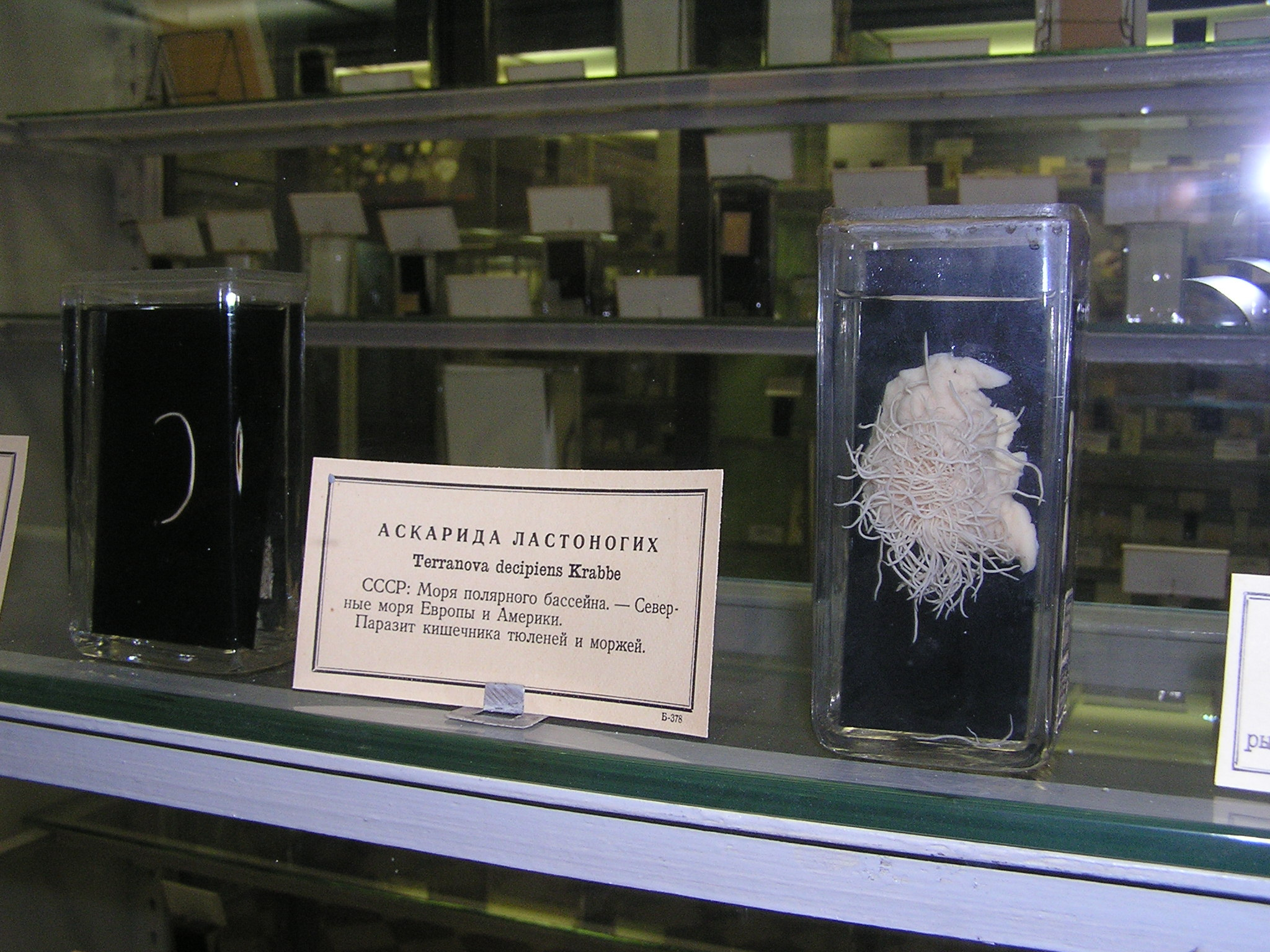
Nematodes

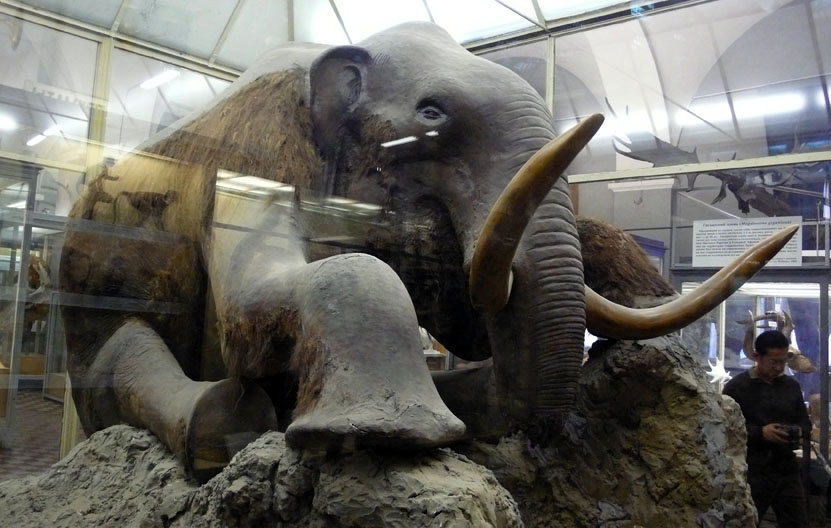
The only mounted mammoth in the world

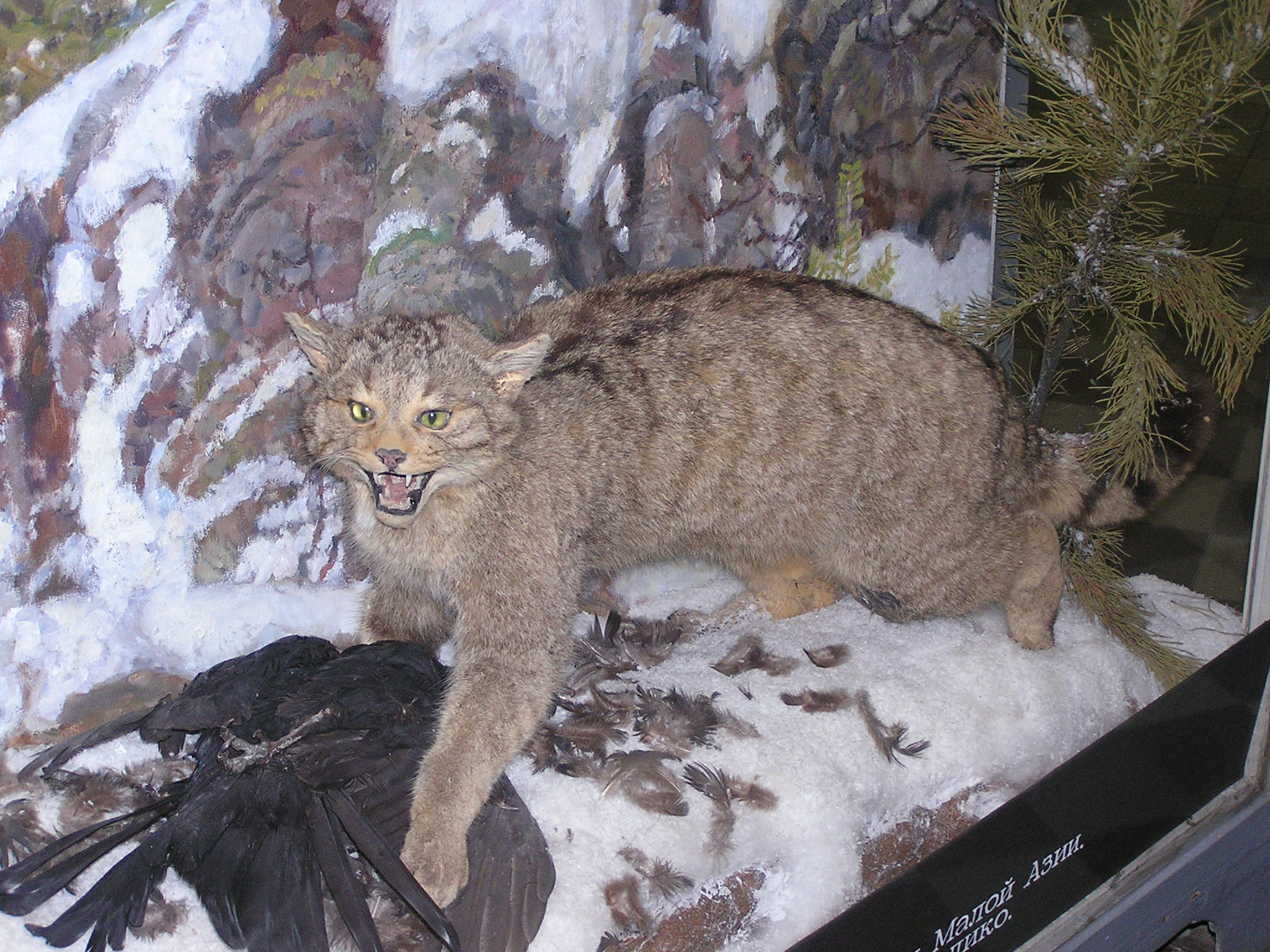
A small diorama

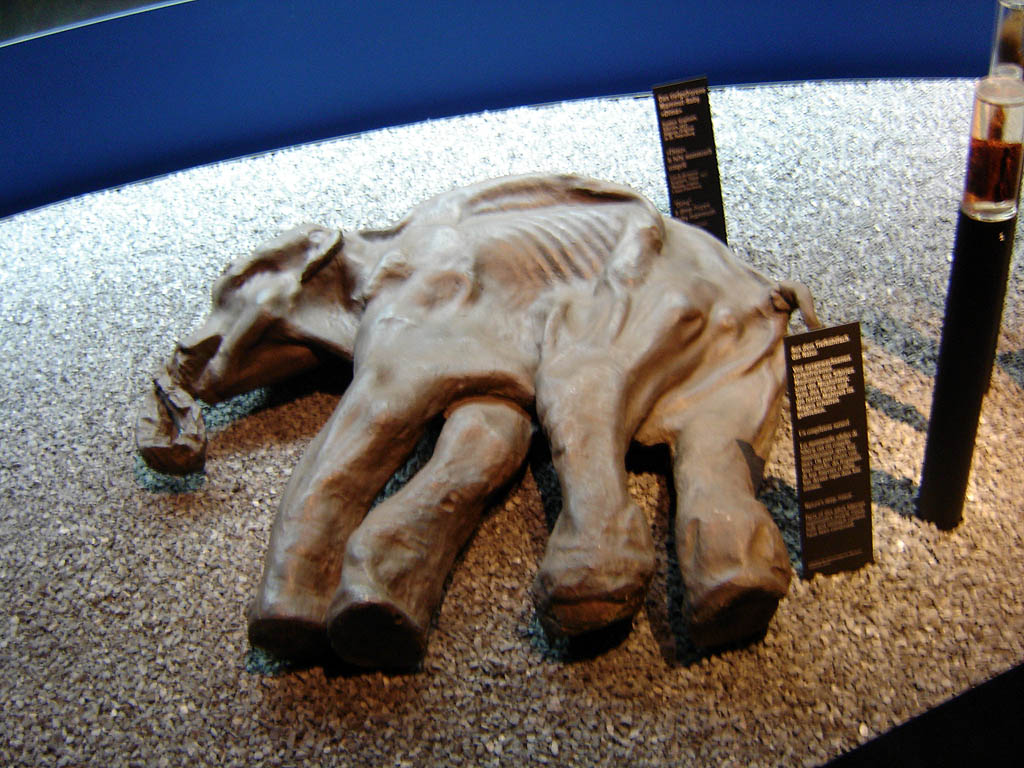
Baby mammoth Dima

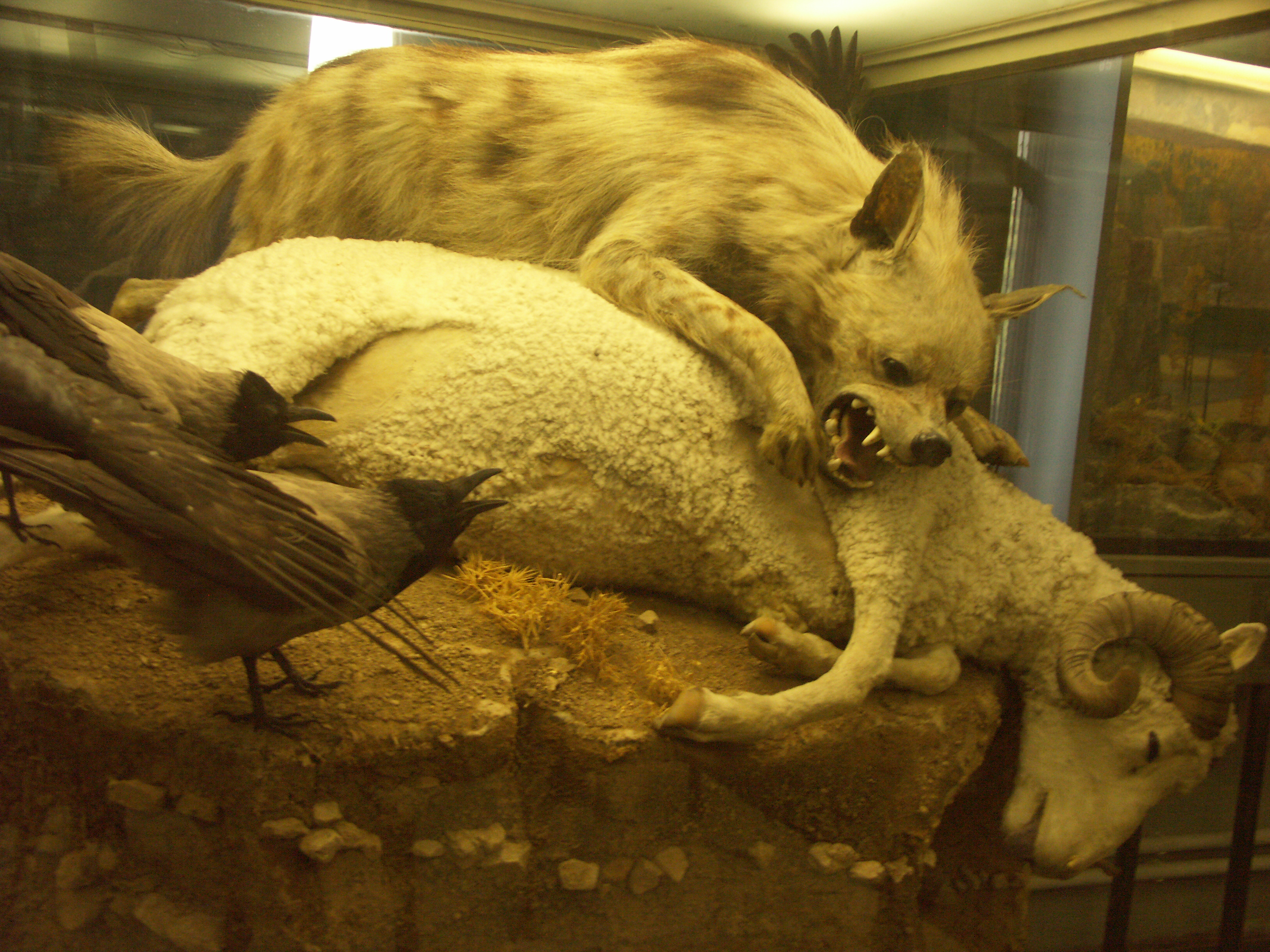
Striped hyena

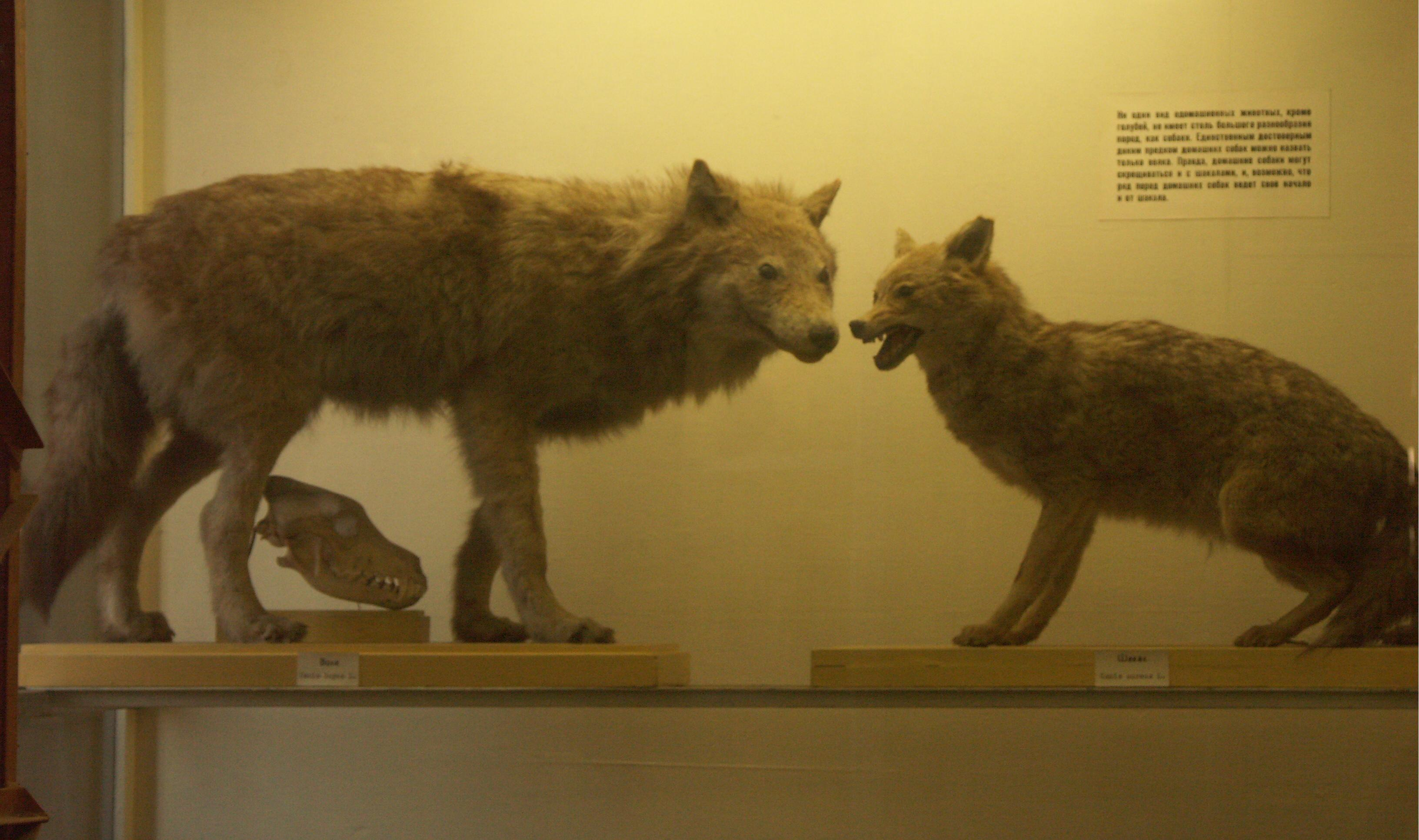
Grey wolf and golden jackal

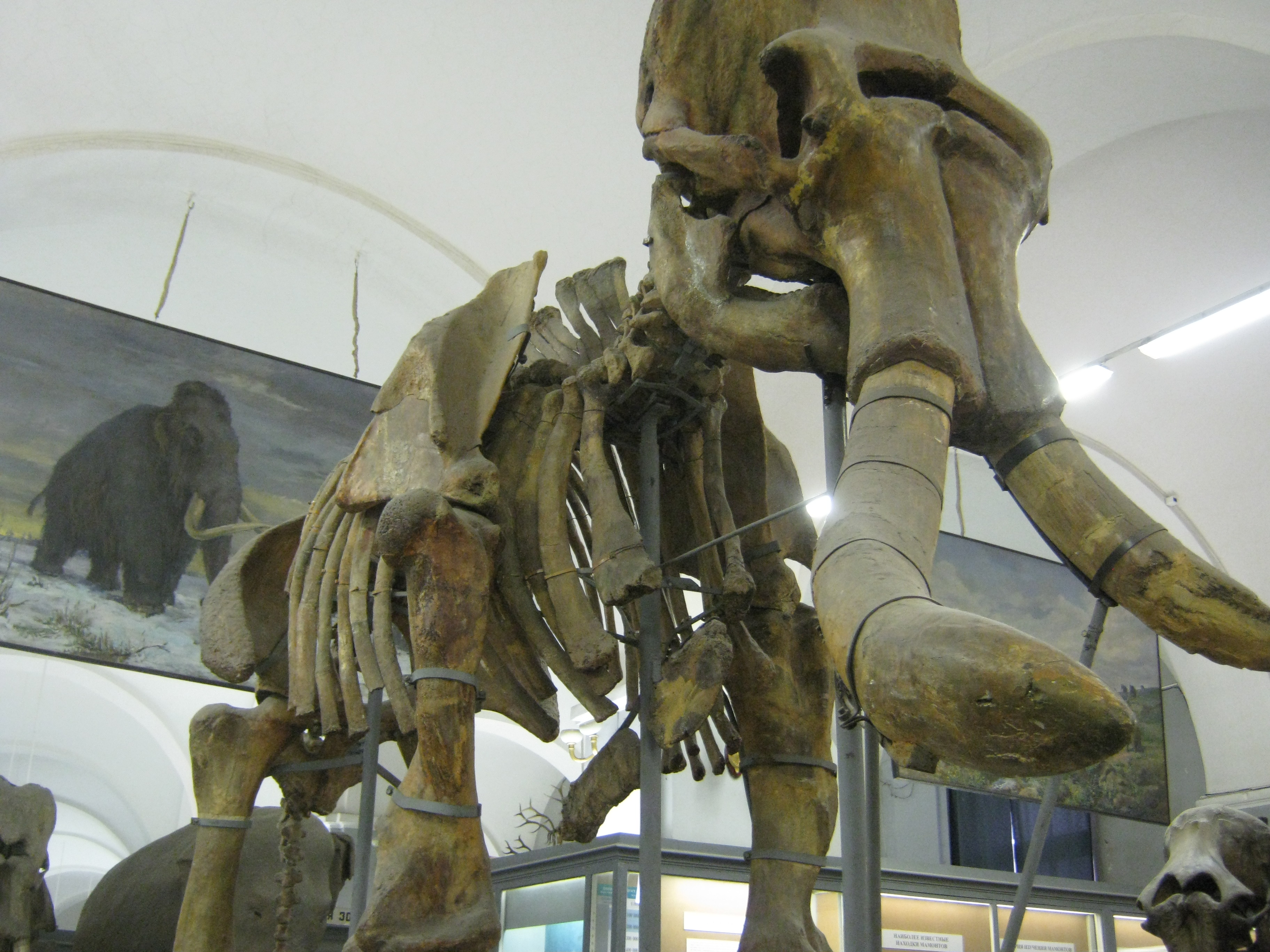
Mammoth skeleton

== Sources ==
- Hill, James (12 November 2018). "A 'Time Capsule' for Scientists, Courtesy of Peter the Great". New York Times.
