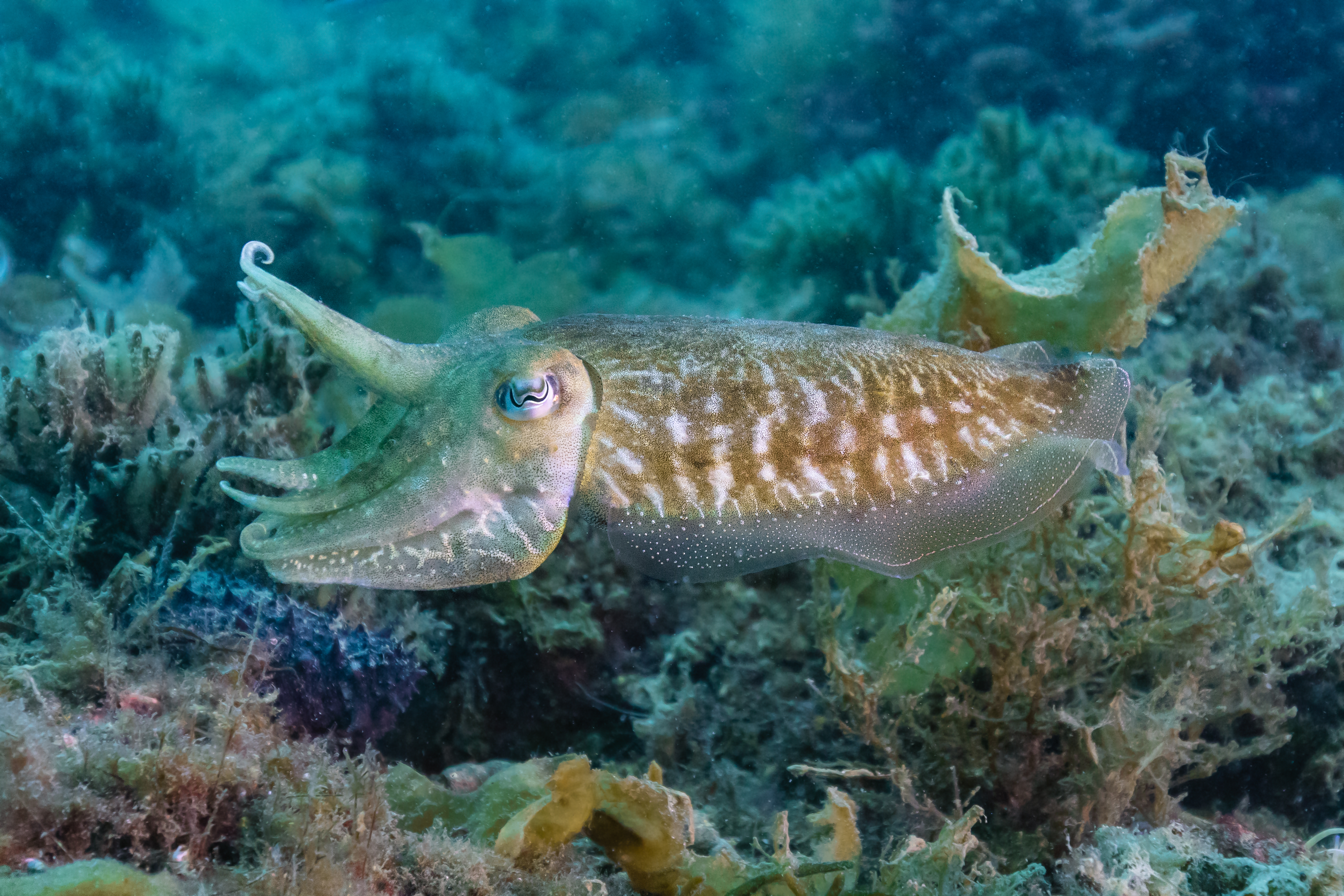
- Sepia officinalis; Sepiidae
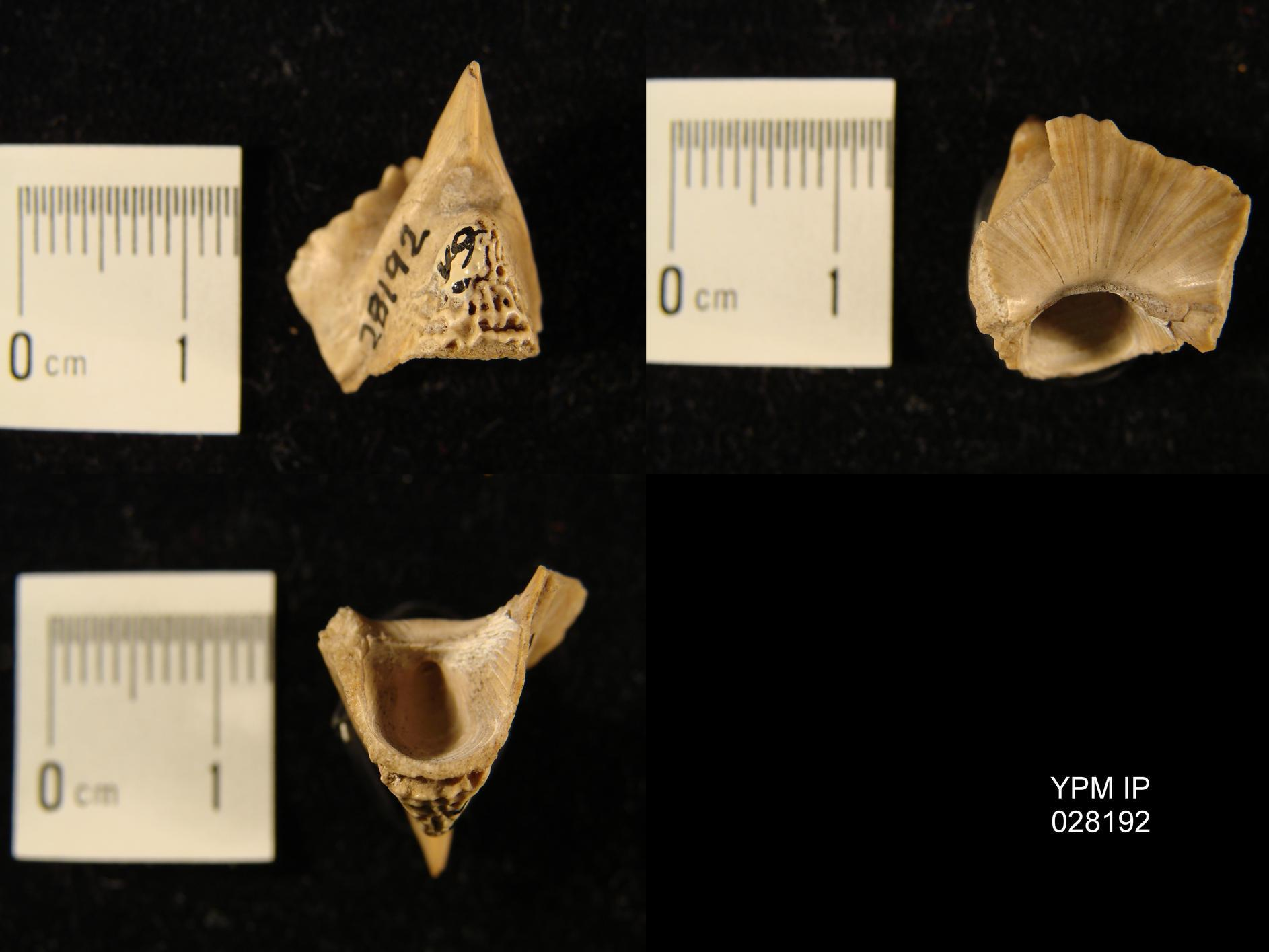
- †Belosaepia sepioidea; Belosaepiidae

Scientific classification
- Kingdom: Animalia
- Phylum: Mollusca
- Class: Cephalopoda
- Superorder: Decapodiformes
- Order: Sepiida; Gray, 1849

= Sepiida =

Sepiida Temporal range: Maastrichtian– recent

Order of molluscs

Sepiida is an order of ten-armed cephalopods. This order contains the following superfamilies and families:

== Taxonomy ==
- Order Sepiida
  - Superfamily Sepioidea
    - Family †Anomalosaepiidae Yancey & Garvie, 2011
    - Family †Belosaepiidae Dixon, 1850
    - Family Sepiidae W.E. Leach, 1817
  - Superfamily †Vasseurioidea
    - Family †Vasseuriidae
    - Family †Belosepiellidae

The bobtail or bottletail squid (order Sepiolida) were previously placed within this order as the suborder Sepiolina (sister to a suborder Sepiina), but they are now understood to form their own distinct order; their exact relationship with the cuttlefish is currently in flux, but they have not been recovered close to Sepiida in recent phylogenetic analyses (see Decapodiformes#Taxonomy).
