= Sepia pulchra =

Conservation status
- Data Deficient (IUCN 3.1)

Scientific classification
- Kingdom: Animalia
- Phylum: Mollusca
- Class: Cephalopoda
- Order: Sepiida
- Family: Sepiidae
- Genus: Sepia
- Subgenus: Hemisepius
- Species: S. pulchra

Binomial name
- Sepia pulchra Roeleveld & Liltved, 1985

Species of cuttlefish

Sepia pulchra is a species of cuttlefish native to the southeastern Atlantic Ocean, specifically off the Cape Peninsula in South Africa. It lives at depths of between 15 and 50 m.

The type specimen was collected off Llandudno, Cape Peninsula. It is deposited at the South African Museum in Cape Town.

== Description ==
Sepia pulchra grows to a mantle length of 22 mm. It has a warty mantle and is reddish-brown in colour with a large purple patch on the back. It has fins of variable width, which are usually fairly wide, beginning relatively far back on the body. There are three-pronged cirri over each eye.

== Ecology ==
This cuttlefish is usually found on vertical surface, with its head facing downwards. It is seldom spotted because of its excellent camouflage.
