= Decorisepia australis =

Conservation status
- Least Concern (IUCN 3.1)

Scientific classification
- Kingdom: Animalia
- Phylum: Mollusca
- Class: Cephalopoda
- Order: Sepiida
- Family: Sepiidae
- Genus: Decorisepia
- Species: D. australis

Binomial name
- Decorisepia australis Quoy & Gaimard, 1832

Synonyms
- Sepia capensis d'Orbigny, 1845; Sepia sinope Gray, 1849

Species of cuttlefish

Decorisepia australis, the southern cuttlefish, is a species of cuttlefish which is found in the eastern South Atlantic Ocean and the western Indian Ocean off the coasts of Southern Africa, possibly extending into the waters off East Africa.

== Description ==
Decorisepia australis has widely-separated, posteriorly rounded fins. The arms have the suckers arranged in four series with the middle series of suckers consisting of slightly larger suckers than the lateral ones, this difference being more pronounced in male. The hectocotylus is found on the left ventral arm and has two rows of normal size suckers near its base, six or seven rows of greatly reduced suckers in the middle which become normal sized towards the tip of the arm. Suckers in two of the dorsal and two of the ventral series are laterally displaced and show a gap between them. The short tentacular club is crescent-shaped and has five suckers arranged in crosswise rows, these suckers show great differences in size with 3 very enlarged suckers near the base of the club. The swimming keel of the club, extends a very short distance towards the carpus at the club's base. The dorsal and ventral protective membranes are separate and are not connected at base of club.

It has an oval cuttlebone which is bluntly rounded at its anterior end and has a sharp posterior end. It shows strong ventral recurving and the dorsal surface is convex, smooth and creamy white in colour. The bone's long, straight spine and posterior quarter are covered with an ochre-coloured smooth glaze. The dorsal median rib of the bone is indistinct and broadens slightly anteriorly; the bone's ribs are bordered laterally by obvious grooves and the lateral ribs are marked. The whole margin of the cuttlebone is surrounded by chitin.

The overall colour is purplish-brown with pale fins which have a broad orange-pink band along their base dorsally while some pigment is present ventrally. There is a concentration of chromatophores near fins on both the dorsal and ventral surfaces of the cuttlefish's body. They grow up to 85 mm in mantle length and 50 g total weight.

== Distribution ==
The species is known to occur in the south eastern Atlantic Ocean and the extreme south western Indian Ocean and is found from southern Namibia to Port Elizabeth in the Eastern Cape Province of South Africa. There are reports of records from further east and north as far as the Gulf of Aden. The reports of this species off China, referred to as Sepia sinope by John Edward Gray are likely to be erroneous.

== Habitat and ecology ==
Decorisepia australis can be found at depths of 45 to 345 m and is most numerous at 60 to 190 m. It thrives in regions where the oxygen levels are low and in the northernmost part of its range off Namibia the highest catches occur where oxygen levels in the water are between 1.5 ml per litre to 3.5 ml per litre and the temperature is around 9 °C. Mature cuttlefish are found off the southern coasts of South Africa in early winter and it is thought that this species' main spawning grounds are to be found in deeper water on the western flank of the Agulhas Bank. Males mature earlier than females and are sexually reproductive for longer, increased temperatures accelerate sexual maturation and spawning. Spawning can occur all year, depending on the water temperature and the depth with the largest cuttlefish occurring in the cooler and deeper waters of the west. A survey conducted in 1988 found that differences in size and maturity of S. australis in different areas were most strongly correlated to water temperature and that depth and longitude were also important factors. The results of this survey further indicated that the main spawning grounds of S. australis off the south coast of South Africa are situated in deeper water on the western side of the Agulhas Bank.

An opportunistic predator, it takes both benthic and pelagic crustaceans, fish, and cephalopods. Crustaceans sampled from the stomachs of S. australis are often too well digested to identify but were mainly mysids, megalopae larvae, krill, and hyperiids, as well as some fish. Cannibalism has also been recorded, and this represented the only cephalopod prey recorded and this was more frequent in the eastern, less optimal, part of the species range. Fish species recorded as being preyed on by S. australis were identified using otoliths recovered with fish forming between 5% and 13% of the cuttlefish's diet. Species recorded included lanternfish Lampadena speculigera, tonguesole Cynoglossus zanzibarensis, ladder dragonet Paracallionymus costatus, the Cape hake Merluccius capensis and Cape conger Conger wilsoni. Krill make up just over half the volume of prey taken. Cannibalism and fish were more important in the diet in the east of its range than in the west, possibly as a result of a lower abundance of crustaceans in the east.

This cuttlefish forms an important part of the diet of Cape fur seals, hake, skate and other commercially exploited whitefish.

== Fisheries ==
Decorisepia australis is not currently subject to commercial exploitation, but as an apparently abundant species with "tasty flesh", it may be of interest to fisheries in the future.

== Naming ==
The type specimen was collected during the second exploratory voyage of the Astrolabe, its first under the command of Jules Dumont d'Urville, which lasted from 1826 to 1829. It was described by Jean René Constant Quoy and Joseph Paul Gaimard in their 1932 account of the zoological collections of the expedition and the type is lodged at the Museum National d'Histoire Naturelle in Paris.
