= Sepia thurstoni =

Conservation status
- Data Deficient (IUCN 3.1)

Scientific classification
- Kingdom: Animalia
- Phylum: Mollusca
- Class: Cephalopoda
- Order: Sepiida
- Family: Sepiidae
- Genus: Sepia
- Subgenus: Acanthosepion
- Species: S. thurstoni

Binomial name
- Sepia thurstoni Adam & Rees, 1966

Species of cuttlefish

Sepia thurstoni is a species of cuttlefish native to the Indian Ocean, specifically the waters off Chennai in India and off Negombo and Hambantota in Sri Lanka. It lives at depths of 20 to 40 m.

Sepia thurstoni grows to a mantle length of 110 mm.

The type specimen was collected by the Edgar Thurston in 1894 off Ramesvaram Island in the Bay of Bengal (09°18′N 79°19′E) and is deposited at The Natural History Museum in London. It was not named until 1966 when it was described by Adam and Rees in their review of the collections of the British Museum Natural History's cephalopod collections.
