= Sepia pardex =

Conservation status
- Data Deficient (IUCN 3.1)

Scientific classification
- Kingdom: Animalia
- Phylum: Mollusca
- Class: Cephalopoda
- Order: Sepiida
- Family: Sepiidae
- Genus: Sepia
- Subgenus: Doratosepion
- Species: S. pardex

Binomial name
- Sepia pardex Sasaki, 1913

Synonyms
- Sepia pardalis Sasaki, 1914

Species of cuttlefish

Sepia pardex is a species of cuttlefish native to the western Pacific Ocean, specifically off Japan, along the Pacific coast from the Chiba Peninsula, and along the Japan Sea coast from Toyama Bay to South Korea. It is also present off Taiwan and in the East China Sea. The depth range of this species is unknown.

Sepia pardex grows to a mantle length of 230 mm.

The type specimen was collected off Kajiyama, Chiba Prefecture, Japan. It is deposited at the University Museum of the University of Tokyo.
