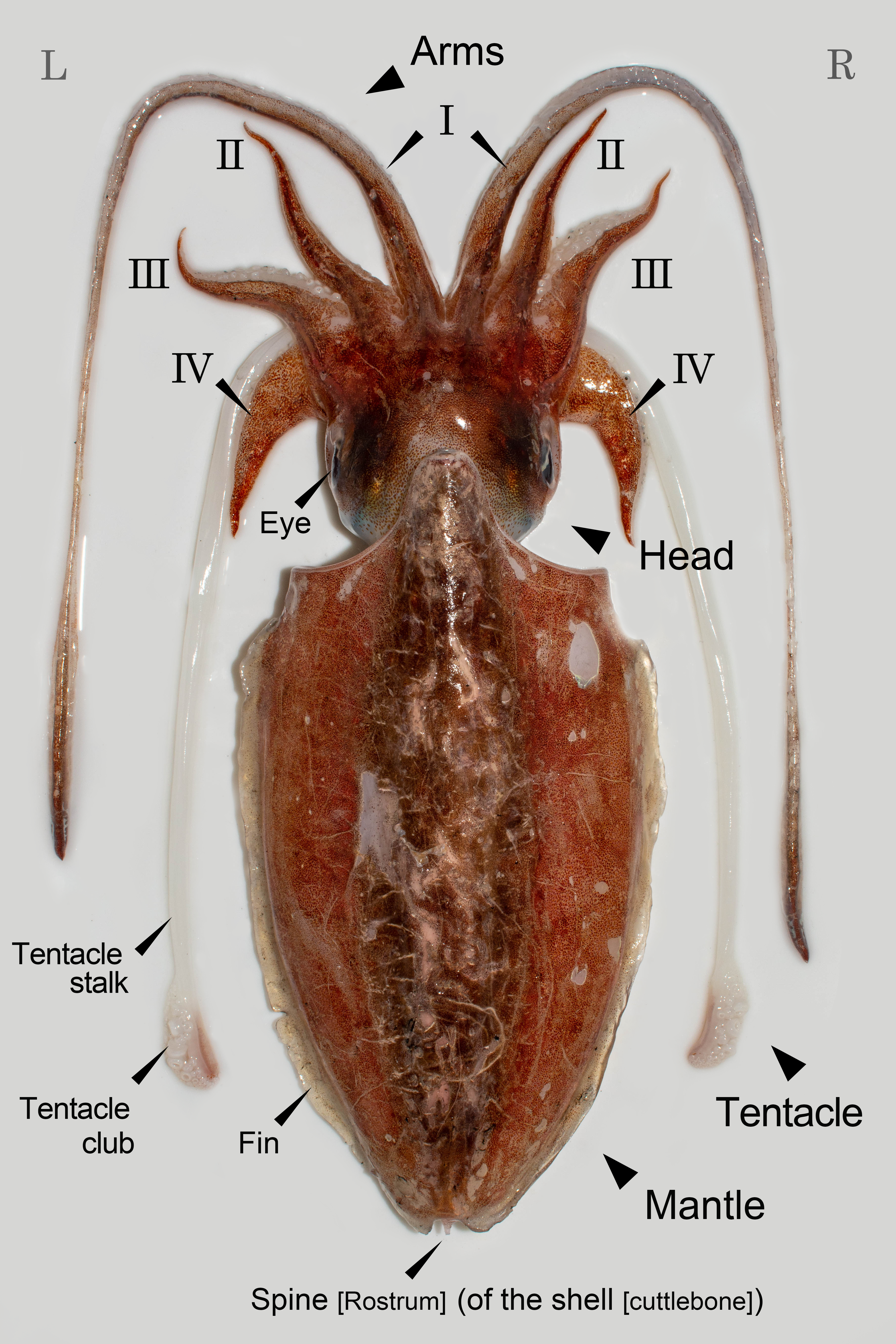

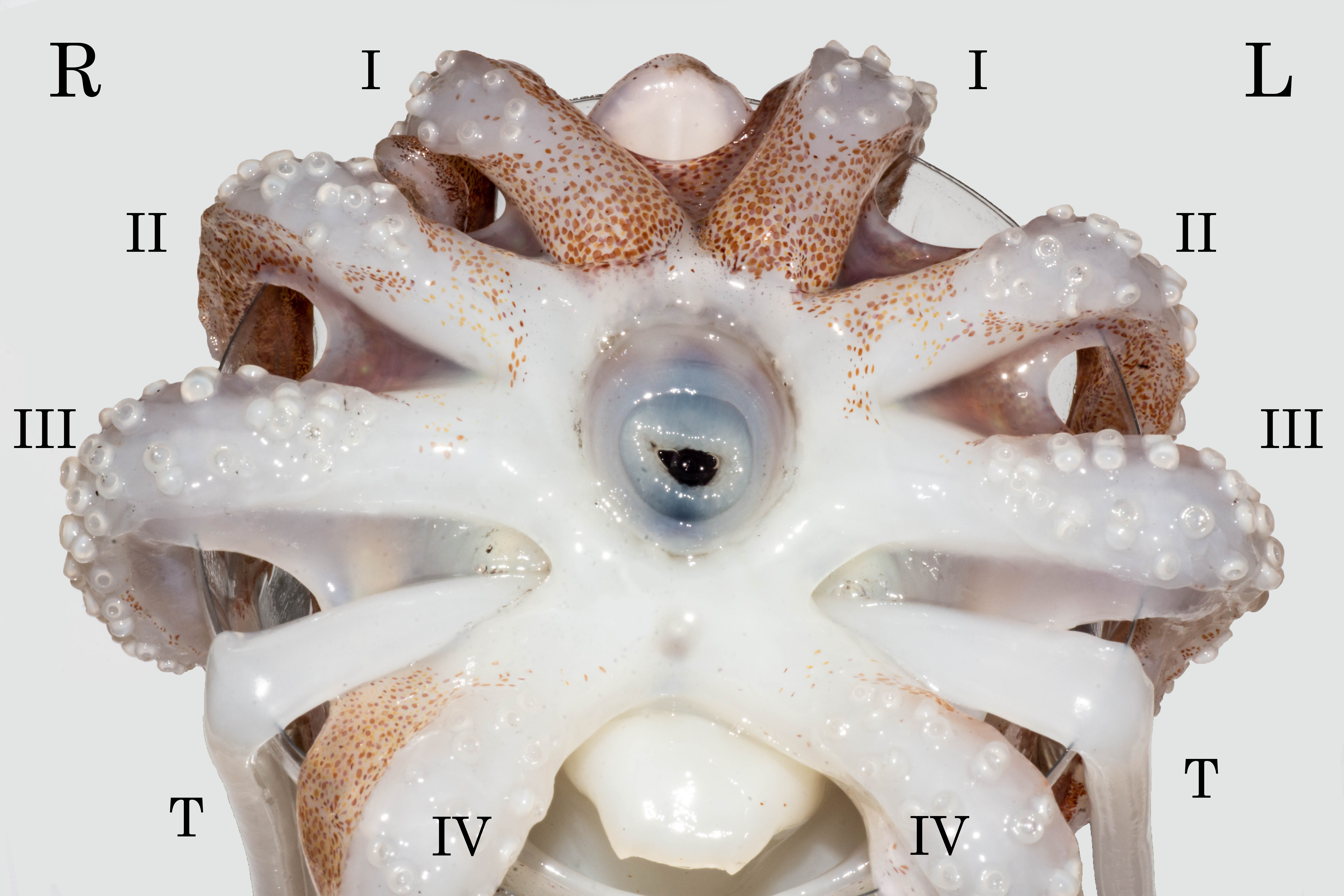

Conservation status
- Data Deficient (IUCN 3.1)

Scientific classification
- Kingdom: Animalia
- Phylum: Mollusca
- Class: Cephalopoda
- Order: Sepiida
- Family: Sepiidae
- Genus: Sepia
- Subgenus: Doratosepion
- Species: S. lorigera

Binomial name
- Sepia lorigera (Wülker, 1910)

= Sepia lorigera =

Species of cuttlefish

Sepia lorigera, also known as the spider cuttlefish, is a species of cuttlefish in the family Sepiidae. The species has been observed from off the coasts of Japan and Vietnam, and adults can reach a maximum size of ~25 centimeters. Members of the species are gonochoric.
