= Lusepia hieronis =

Conservation status
- Data Deficient (IUCN 3.1)

Scientific classification
- Kingdom: Animalia
- Phylum: Mollusca
- Class: Cephalopoda
- Order: Sepiida
- Family: Sepiidae
- Genus: Lusepia; A. Reid, 2023
- Species: L. hieronis

Binomial name
- Lusepia hieronis (Robson, 1924))

Synonyms
- Rhombosepion hieronis Robson, 1924; Sepia hieronis (Robson, 1924)

Species of cuttlefish

Lusepia hieronis is a species of cuttlefish native to the southeastern Atlantic Ocean and southwestern Indian Ocean, specifically southern Namibia, from approximately 27°S to Port Alfred, South Africa, and east Africa from 17°S to Kenya and Mozambique. It is also present in the Saya-de-Malha Bank. It lives at depths of between 43 and 500 m (141 and 1,640 ft), although it is most abundant at 110 to 250 m (360 to 820 ft) depth.

Lusepia hieronis grows to a mantle length of 70 mm (2.8 in).

The type specimen was collected off Cape Town, South Africa (32°32' to 33°03'S, 17°29' to 17°42'E). It is deposited at The Natural History Museum in London.
