= William James Rees =

British zoologist (1913–1967)

William James Rees (1913–1967) was a British hydroid and cephalopod researcher at the Natural History Museum in London. He described a number of species, including Sepia dubia, Sepia sewelli, and Sepia thurstoni.
