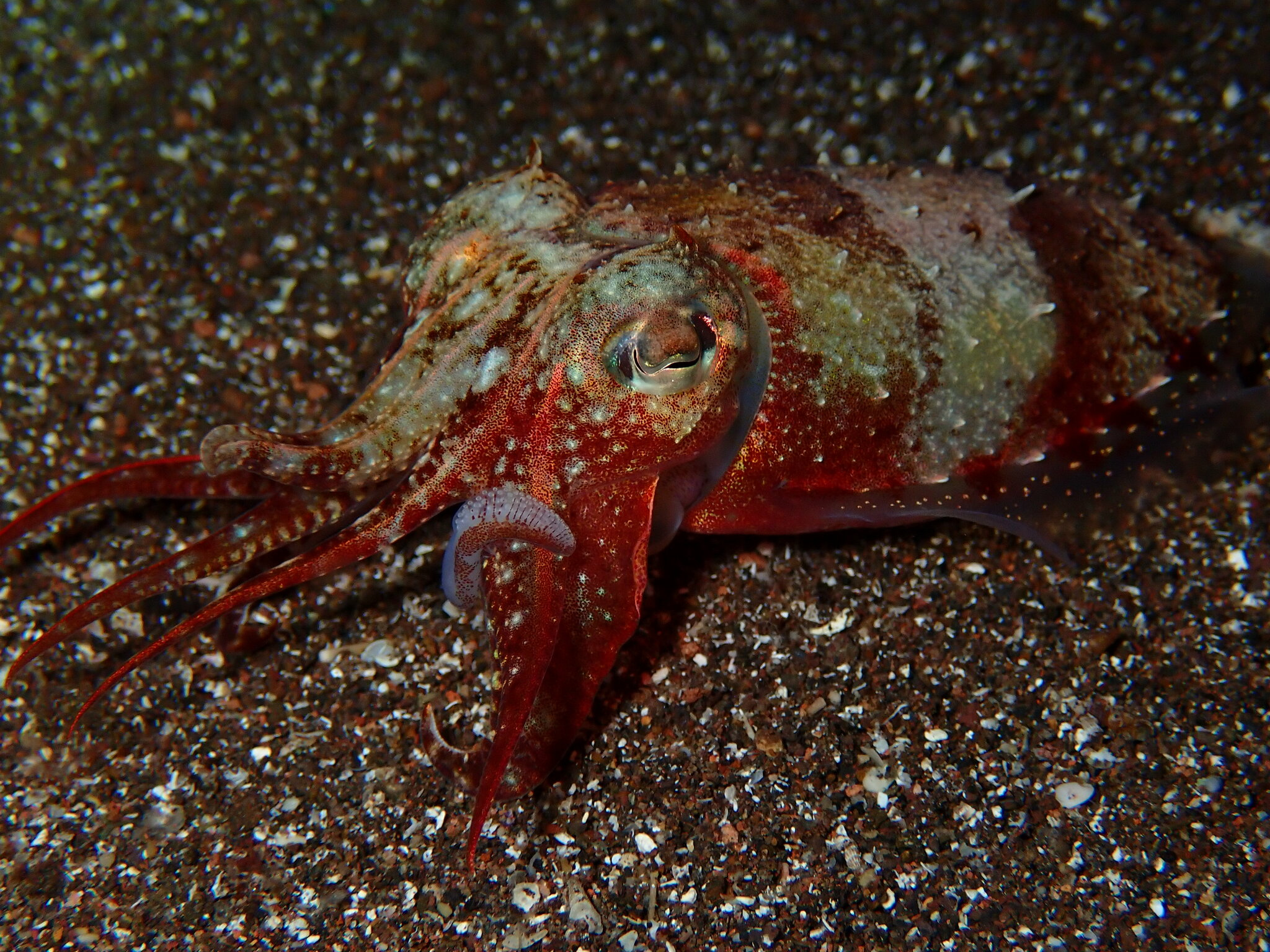

Conservation status
- Data Deficient (IUCN 3.1)

Scientific classification
- Kingdom: Animalia
- Phylum: Mollusca
- Class: Cephalopoda
- Order: Sepiida
- Family: Sepiidae
- Genus: Sepia
- Subgenus: Sepia
- Species: S. bertheloti

Binomial name
- Sepia bertheloti d'Orbigny in Férussac & d'Orbigny, 1835

Synonyms
- Sepia mercatoris Adam, 1937; Sepia verrucosa Lönnberg, 1896

= Sepia bertheloti =

Species of cuttlefish

Sepia bertheloti, the African cuttlefish, is a species of cuttlefish from the family Sepiidae which is found in the warmer waters of the eastern Atlantic Ocean off Africa.

== Description ==
Sepia bertheloti grows to a mantle length of 175mm in males and 134mm in females. The dorsal anterior mantle margin forms a triangular lobe between the eyes. The wide fines have a wide gap between them at the rear. The males have a hectocotylus on the left ventral arm and this has one or two rows of normal size suckers at the base, nine to thirteen rows of highly shrunken suckers in the middle part of the arm; these suckers are arranged in two dorsal and two ventral series which are laterally displaced and are separated by a gap. The suckers on the hectocotylus are covered by a well developed dorsal protective membrane. The tentacular club is straight and slender having five or six suckers in transverse rows in which a number of the suckers of the inner two or three rows are larger than rest. The cuttlebone is oblong in shape, outline roughly rectangular; tapering to a point anteriorly and rounded and blunt posteriorly. Its dorsal surface is evenly convex and covered with a sculpture of calcareous granulose arranged in a net like pattern which have their greatest concentration in the middle of the bone and at the long edges where they are arranged in irregular ridges parallel to the margin. The bone is most calcified at the rear and there is an indistinct dorsal median rib which broadens slightly towards the head end. The lateral and anterior margins of the cuttlebone are covered in chitin. On the dorsal part of the mantle there are a series of elongate papillae on either flank, situated around halfway along the base of the fins. It is purplish brown in colour with a zebra-like striping on the arms and an orange-red pigmented stripe which runs along their outer surface. The dorsal mantle has small spots, mainly towards the rear, and narrow, cream-coloured, broken lines running across it. The fins are pale and in the males there is a thin, shiny orange-pink stripe along the fin base of males which is bordered by a purplish band and one or two rows of many short bars which run along it.

== Distribution ==
Sepia bertheloti occurs along the western coast of Africa from Western Sahara south to Angola, it is also found off the Canary Islands.

== Habitat and ecology ==
Sepia bertheloti is found at depths of between 20m and 156m, being most numerous off the Canary Islands from depths of 70m-140m. At the Endeavour Bank they migrate to shallower waters on order to spawn in the summer and autumn. Their size distribution, as measured from animals caught by fisheries, shows a wider variation than for the sympatric Sepia officinalis during the summer. This wider variation suggests that either the spawning season is extended or at least some spawning happens continuously.

== Fisheries ==
Sepia bertheloti is fished for by trawling off the Canary Islands and is commonly captured off the western Endeavour Bank. Catches are often mixed with Sepia hierredda and separate data is difficult to get, although data from Spanish trawlers off Western Sahara indicate that this species makes up 11% of the cuttlefish catch and the remaining 89% is S. hieradda. There are also fisheries for this species in Mauritania and Senegal.

== Naming ==
The specific name honours the French malacologist Sabin Berthelot (1794-1880) who was French consul at Tenerife. The type specimen was taken off Tenerife and is held in the Muséum national d'Histoire naturelle.
