= Decorisepia hedleyi =

Conservation status
- Least Concern (IUCN 3.1)

Scientific classification
- Kingdom: Animalia
- Phylum: Mollusca
- Class: Cephalopoda
- Order: Sepiida
- Family: Sepiidae
- Genus: Decorisepia
- Species: D. hedleyi

Binomial name
- Decorisepia hedleyi Berry, 1918

Synonyms
- Decorisepia rex Iredale, 1926; Sepia dannevigi Berry, 1918; Sepia rex (Iredale, 1926)

Species of cuttlefish

Decorisepia hedleyi, or Hedley's cuttlefish, is a species of cuttlefish in the family Sepiidae, endemic to subtropical and temperate waters off Australia.

== Description ==
Decorisepia hedleyi is a relatively small species of cuttlefish with a mantle length of 83 mm in males and 102 mm in females. It is beige in colour lacking any markings on the arms. There are longitudinal rows of up to 6 ridge-like bumps forming ridges along each side, next to the base of each fin which vary in colour from orange to pink. The tentacular club is crescent-shaped and has a flattened surface which bears 9 to 12 suckers in transverse rows. The fins are widest in their posterior third, rounded at their posterior ends where there is a narrow separation between the fins. The cuttlebone is oblong.

== Distribution ==
Decorisepia hedleyi is endemic to the waters off Australia. Its range extends from the Great Barrier Reef off Queensland around the eastern, southern, and western coasts of Australia to just to the south west of Shark Bay in Western Australia, including Tasmania.

== Habitat and ecology ==
Decorisepia hedleyi occurs from shallow water to the continental slope, with the maximum depth recorded being 1092 m and the minimum 47 m.

== Fisheries ==
Decorisepia hedleyi is frequently caught as bycatch in trawl fisheries in which the quarry is prawn or mixed species.

== Naming ==
Hedley's cuttlefish was named by the American malacologist Samuel Stillman Berry in 1918. It honours the English born Australian conchologist Charles Hedley 1862-1926. The type specimen was collected in the Investigator Strait and is held in the Australian Museum in Sydney.
