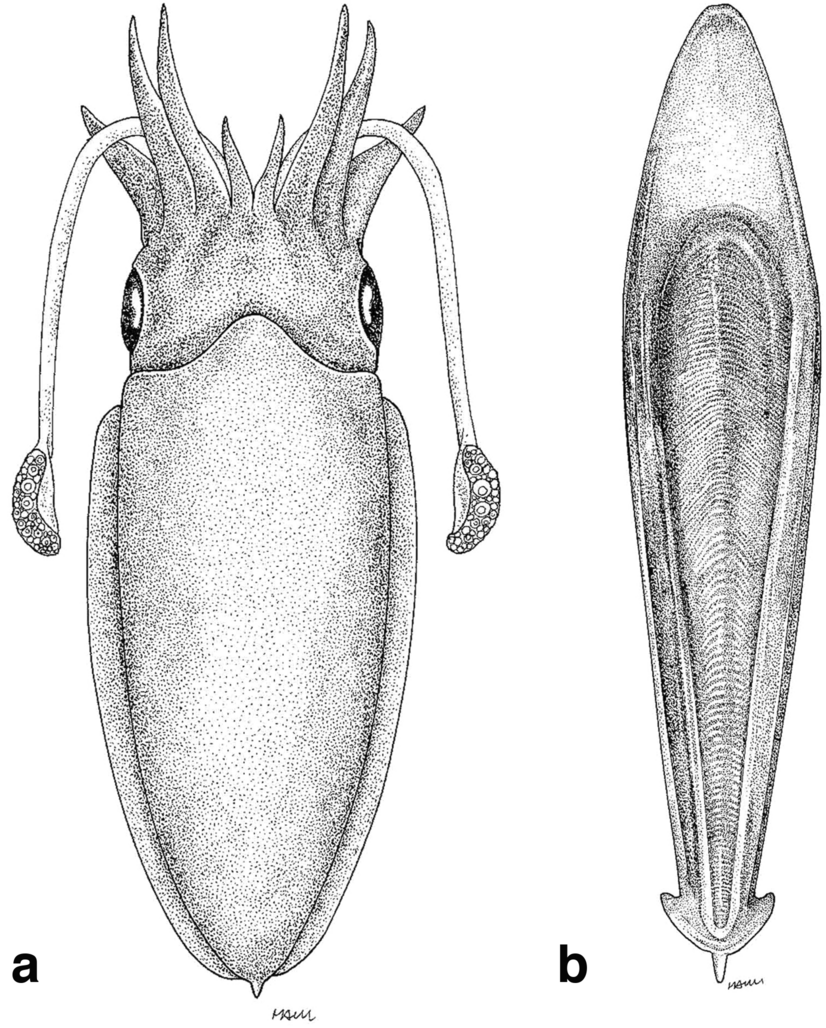

Conservation status
- Least Concern (IUCN 3.1)

Scientific classification
- Kingdom: Animalia
- Phylum: Mollusca
- Class: Cephalopoda
- Order: Sepiida
- Family: Sepiidae
- Genus: Erythalassa; A. Reid, 2023
- Species: E. trygonina

Binomial name
- Erythalassa trygonina (Rochebrune, 1884)

Synonyms
- Doratosepion trygoninum Rochebrune, 1884; Sepia trygonina (Rochebrune, 1884) ·

= Erythalassa trygonina =

Species of cuttlefish

Erythalassa trygonina, the trident cuttlefish, is a species of cuttlefish in the monotypic genus Erythalassa from the Red Sea and the western Indian Ocean. They are also a major source of food for larger marine life like dolphins, seals, and seabirds.

== Description ==
It is characterized by 10 appendages consisting of two tentacles and eight arms that surround the mouth, which are covered in suckers. The difference between arms and tentacle clubs are that tentacles are an elongated arm that ends in a point, while tentacle clubs are a long appendage that has a rounded end. On its tentacle clubs, it has 8 different suckers in distinct rows and then 5 larger sized ones. Some of the arms have a hollowed-out section that replaces suckers. Their legs are placed below their eyes and are held together like a swimming keel. They also have free fins on their head, which are used to maneuver the cuttlefish in the water in whichever way they choose. They are able to propel themselves through the water by pumping water through and out of a siphon in their body. The eyes are covered with a transparent membrane and false eye lids. Their eyes are laterally placed, which allow them to see 177° and use binocular vision to help them hunt and camouflage. They contain only one set of gills. This cuttlefish can be recognized by its small body, slender tentacles, and a lanceolate or leaf-like, shape.

There are some characteristic differences between male and female trident cuttlefish, especially in their arms. For males, one set of their arms are significantly shorter than the others. Additionally, the suckers are in rows of four on their tentacles. In female cuttlefish, the suckers on two pairs of arms are in rows of four. Then on the other pair of arms, the suckers are in rows of four only on the distal third of the arms. Additionally, the area that surrounds the cuttlefish's beak, called the buccal membrane, is covered with longitudinal ridges. Overall, the female trident cuttlefish is generally larger than the male.

=== Camouflage ===
The trident cuttlefish is able to change the color of its skin in 270-730 milliseconds in response to what is going on around them in their environment. They do this by the use of chromatophores, which are organs in their skin that are used for pigmentation. They are able to respond to any conflicting patterns on either side of their body and will replicate those conflicting patterns on their body. They do this by their laterally placed eyes that can see the surrounding environment on either side of them. They also seem to favor their right eye over their left for adjusting camouflage patterns on their body. Then, they use their left eye to scan their surroundings for any potential predators. The trident cuttlefish will camouflage in the presence of absence of any predators.

== Distribution ==
E. trygonina is known from the Indian Ocean, including the Saya de Malha Bank, region of the Mascarene Ridge and Zanzibar, the Red Sea, the Persian Gulf and southern India.

== Habitat ==
The trident cuttlefish occurs at depths of 20 to 410 metres (66 to 1,345 ft). Just like other cephalopods, all cuttlefish go through vertical migration. During the day, they will be at depths around 400m or more and then will travel to up to around 20m or shallower during the night.

== Fisheries ==
This species is an occasional catch for trawlers in India, but is listed as heavily exploited by native fishermen in Yemen.
