= Sepia longipes =

Conservation status
- Data Deficient (IUCN 3.1)

Scientific classification
- Kingdom: Animalia
- Phylum: Mollusca
- Class: Cephalopoda
- Order: Sepiida
- Family: Sepiidae
- Genus: Sepia
- Subgenus: Doratosepion
- Species: S. longipes

Binomial name
- Sepia longipes (Sasaki, 1913)

Species of cuttlefish

Sepia longipes, also known as the longarm cuttlefish, is a species of cuttlefish in the family Sepiidae. They have been observed off the coast of Japan, and can grow to a maximum size of 25 centimeters.
