= Sepia erostrata =

Conservation status
- Least Concern (IUCN 3.1)

Scientific classification
- Kingdom: Animalia
- Phylum: Mollusca
- Class: Cephalopoda
- Order: Sepiida
- Family: Sepiidae
- Genus: Sepia
- Subgenus: Doratosepion
- Species: S. erostrata

Binomial name
- Sepia erostrata Sasaki, 1929

Species of cuttlefish

Sepia erostrata is a species of cuttlefish native to the northwestern Pacific Ocean, specifically off western mainland Japan, from Sagami Bay to the Kii Peninsula. It inhabits subtidal, inshore habitats. It is the commonest species of cuttlefish occurring in rocky shorelines around Japanese coasts.

Sepia erostrata grows to a mantle length of 90 mm.

The type specimen was collected off Manazuru, Kanagawa Prefecture, Japan. It is deposited at the University Museum of the University of Tokyo.
