= Sepia foliopeza =

Conservation status
- Data Deficient (IUCN 3.1)

Scientific classification
- Kingdom: Animalia
- Phylum: Mollusca
- Class: Cephalopoda
- Order: Sepiida
- Family: Sepiidae
- Genus: Sepia
- Subgenus: Doratosepion
- Species: S. foliopeza

Binomial name
- Sepia foliopeza Okutani & Tagawa, in Okutani, Tagawa & Horikawa, 1987

Species of cuttlefish

Sepia foliopeza is a species of cuttlefish native to the western Pacific Ocean, specifically the East China Sea and Taiwan. The depth range of S. foliopeza is unknown.

Sepia foliopeza grows to a mantle length of 110 mm.

The type specimen was collected in the East China Sea. It is deposited at the National Science Museum of Japan in Tokyo.
