= Ascarosepion filibrachia =

Conservation status
- Least Concern (IUCN 3.1)

Scientific classification
- Kingdom: Animalia
- Phylum: Mollusca
- Class: Cephalopoda
- Order: Sepiida
- Family: Sepiidae
- Genus: Ascarosepion
- Species: A. filibrachia

Binomial name
- Ascarosepion filibrachia Reid & Lu, 2005

Species of cuttlefish

Ascarosepion filibrachia is a species of cuttlefish native to the South China Sea. Its natural range covers the waters off Taiwan,^{[a]} Haikou on Hainan Island,^{[b]} and Guryanova in the Gulf of Tonkin, Vietnam. It lives at depths of 34 to 95 m.

Females are on average slightly larger than males. They grow to 70 mm and 62 mm in mantle length, respectively.

The type specimen was collected off Ling Yuan, Kaohsiung, Taiwan (22°28′N 120°24′E).

A. filibrachia is of commercial interest to fisheries and is marketed in Taiwan.

== Notes ==
a. Including Mu-Do-Yu (23°44′N 119°35′E), Peng-Hu, Wu-chi, and Taichung (24°17′N 120°30′E).
b. Specific coordinates: 20°40′N 107°56′E, 18°40′N 106°47′E, and 11°25′N 109°15′E.
