= Sepia tokioensis =

Conservation status
- Data Deficient (IUCN 3.1)

Scientific classification
- Kingdom: Animalia
- Phylum: Mollusca
- Class: Cephalopoda
- Order: Sepiida
- Family: Sepiidae
- Genus: Sepia
- Subgenus: Doratosepion
- Species: S. tokioensis

Binomial name
- Sepia tokioensis Ortmann, 1888

Synonyms
- Sepia misakiensis Wülker, 1910

Species of cuttlefish

Sepia tokioensis is a species of cuttlefish native to the western Pacific Ocean, specifically Japanese waters from Tsugaru Strait to Kyūshū and the Ohsumi Islands, including Sagami Bay, Suruga Bay, the western Japan Sea, and Shimane Prefecture. It lives on the continental shelf.

Sepia tokioensis grows to a mantle length of 90 mm.

The type specimen was collected in Tokyo Bay and is deposited at the Musée zoologique in Strasbourg.
