= Digitosepia dubia =

Conservation status
- Data Deficient (IUCN 3.1)

Scientific classification
- Kingdom: Animalia
- Phylum: Mollusca
- Class: Cephalopoda
- Order: Sepiida
- Family: Sepiidae
- Genus: Digitosepia
- Species: D. dubia

Binomial name
- Digitosepia dubia Adam & Rees, 1966

Synonyms
- Hemisepius dubius (Adam & Rees, 1966)

Species of cuttlefish

Digitosepia dubia is a species of cuttlefish native to the southeastern Atlantic Ocean. It is known only from the type locality, where it was caught at a depth of 25 m.

Digitosepia dubia is known to grow to a mantle length of 17 mm.

The type specimen was collected in False Bay, South Africa (34°11′S 18°27′E). It is deposited at The Natural History Museum in London.
