= Sepia tenuipes =

Conservation status
- Data Deficient (IUCN 3.1)

Scientific classification
- Kingdom: Animalia
- Phylum: Mollusca
- Class: Cephalopoda
- Order: Sepiida
- Family: Sepiidae
- Genus: Sepia
- Subgenus: Doratosepion
- Species: S. tenuipes

Binomial name
- Sepia tenuipes Sasaki, 1929

Species of cuttlefish

Sepia tenuipes is a species of cuttlefish native to the western Pacific Ocean. Its natural range covers the waters off eastern Honshū and the western Japan Sea to the south of Kyūshū, the East China Sea, and Korea. S. tenuipes lives at depths of 100 to 250 m.

Sepia tenuipes grows to a mantle length of 105 mm.

The type specimen was collected off Isohama, Ibaraki Prefecture, Japan. It is deposited at the University Museum of the University of Tokyo.
