= Digitosepia faurei =

Conservation status
- Data Deficient (IUCN 3.1)

Scientific classification
- Kingdom: Animalia
- Phylum: Mollusca
- Class: Cephalopoda
- Order: Sepiida
- Family: Sepiidae
- Genus: Digitosepia
- Species: D. faurei

Binomial name
- Digitosepia faurei Roeleveld, 1972

Species of cuttlefish

Digitosepia faurei is a species of cuttlefish native to the southwestern Indian Ocean, specifically to the east of the Cape of Good Hope, South Africa. It lives at depths to 168 m.

Digitosepia faurei grows to a mantle length of 21 mm.

The type specimen was collected 88 km southeast of Cape Seal, South Africa (35°00′S 23°07′E). It is deposited at the South African Museum in Cape Town.
