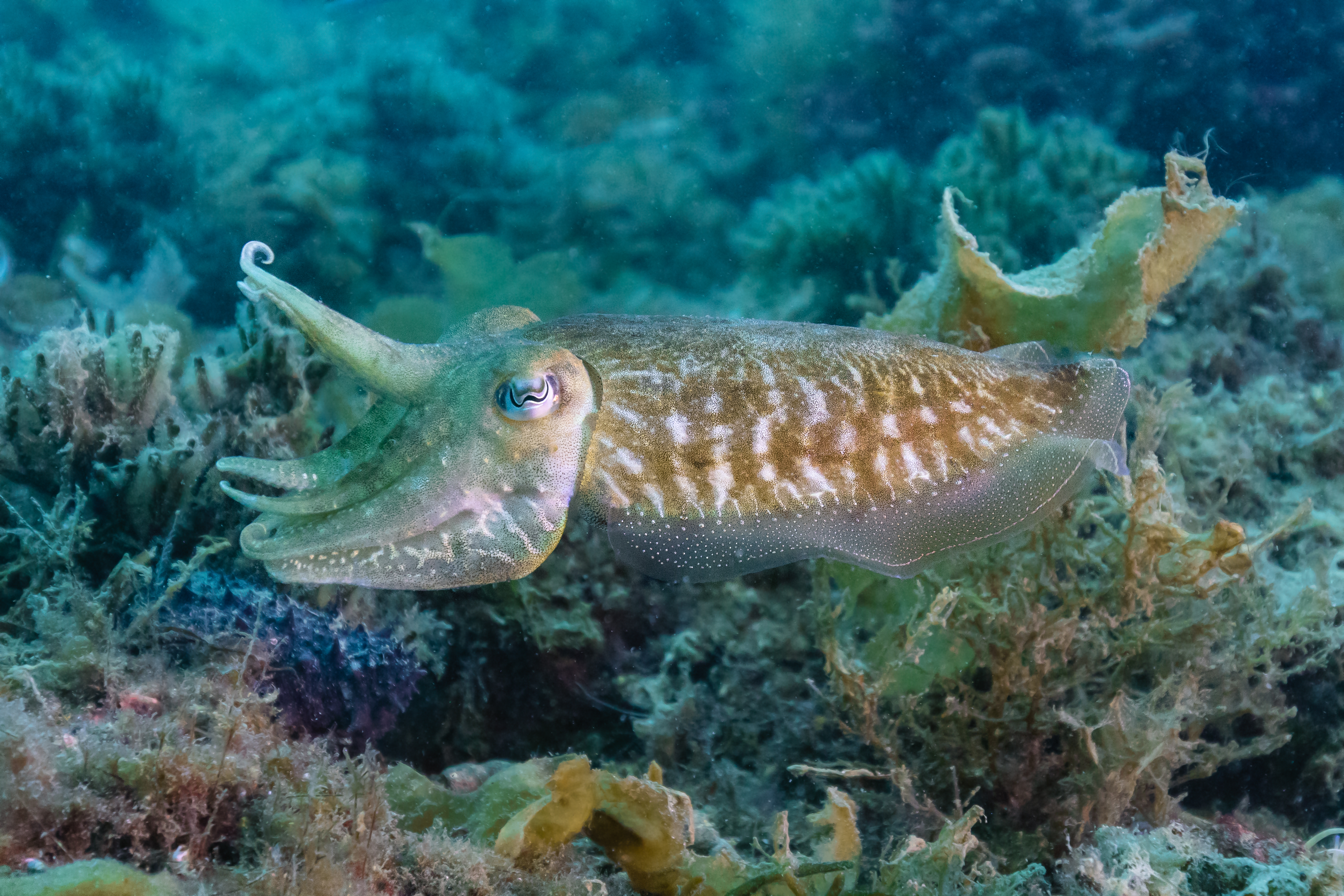
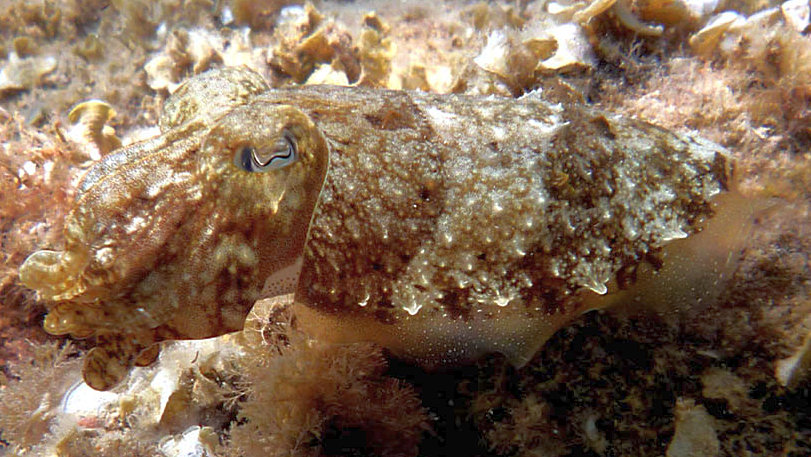
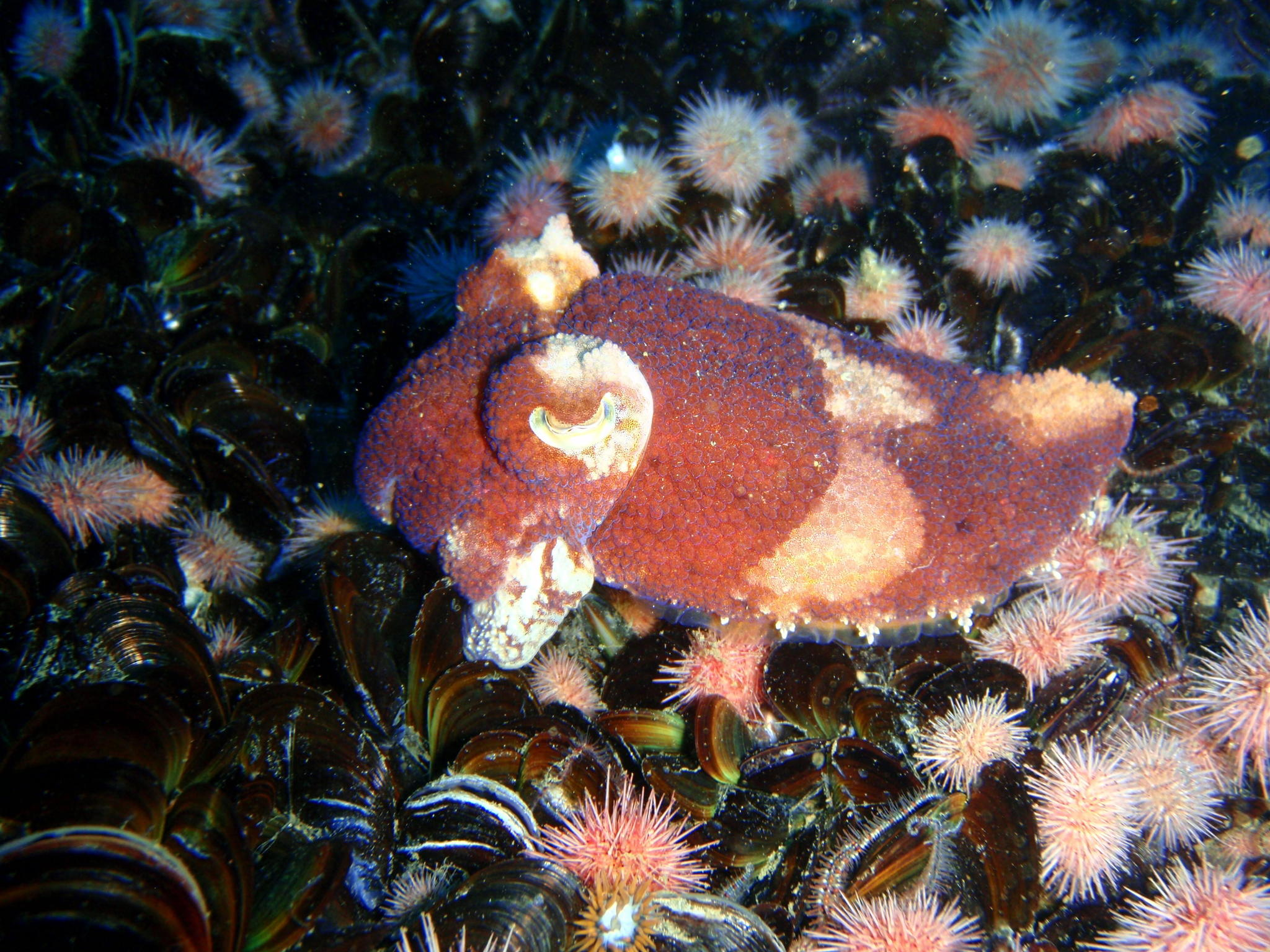
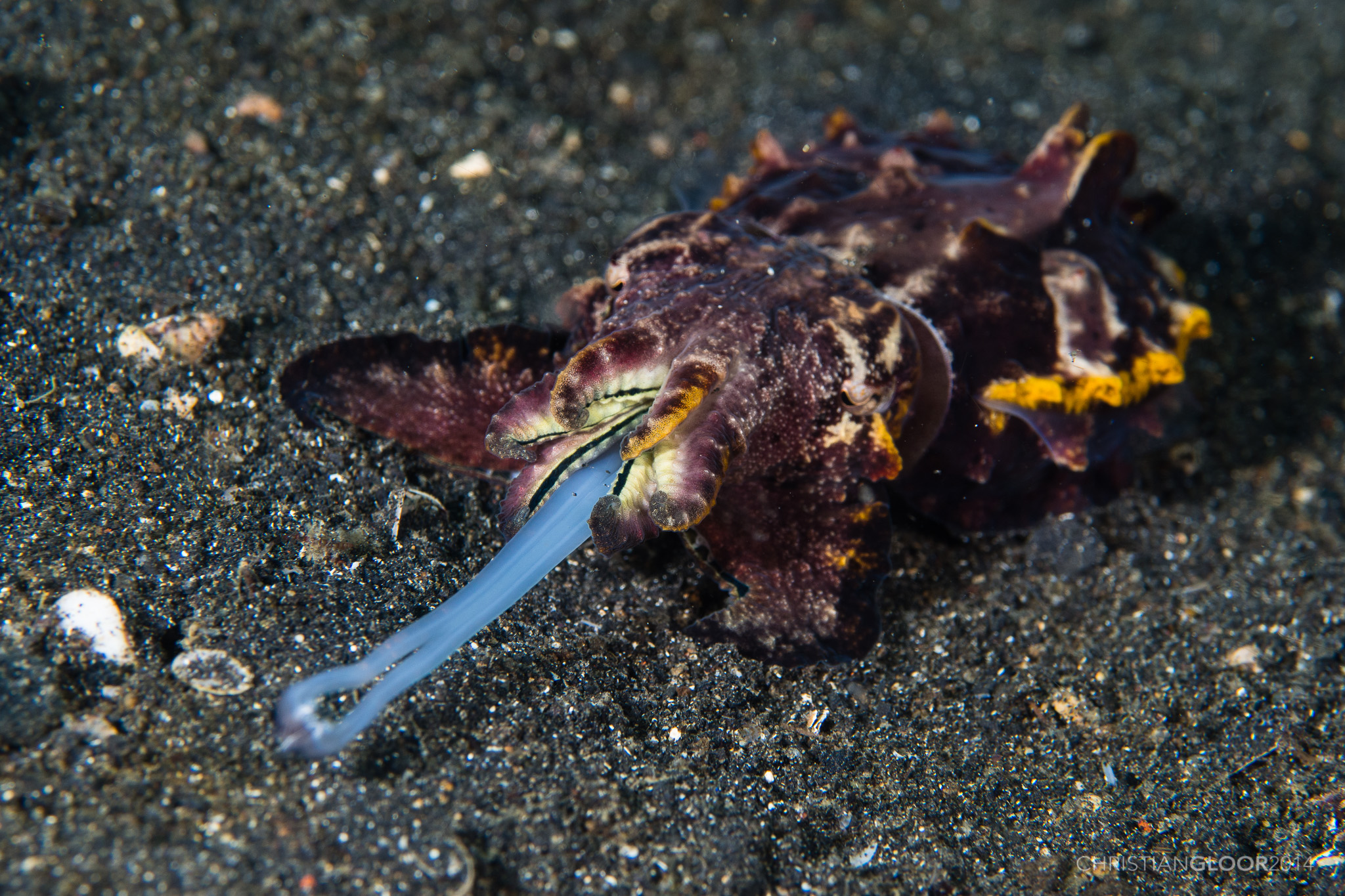
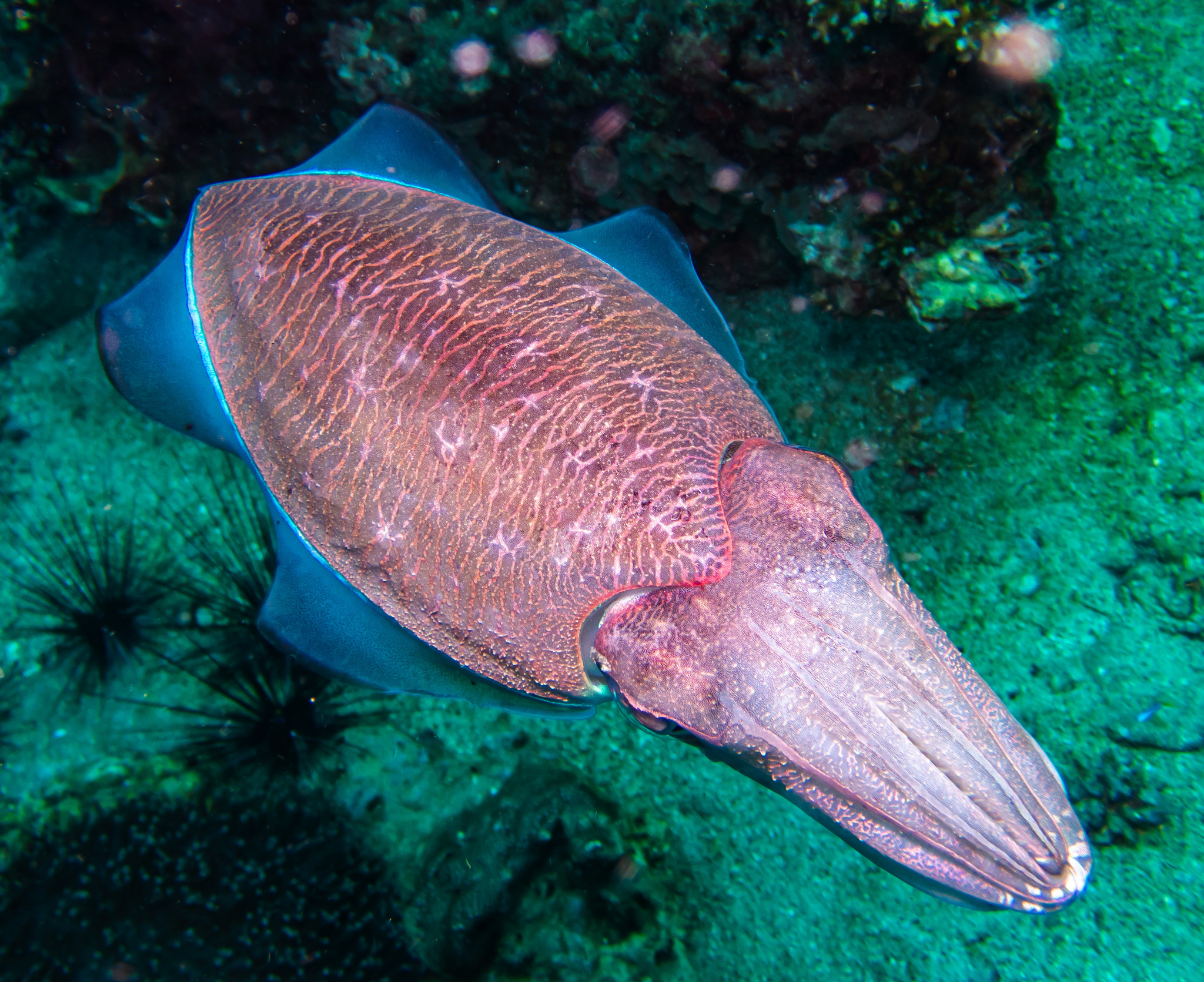
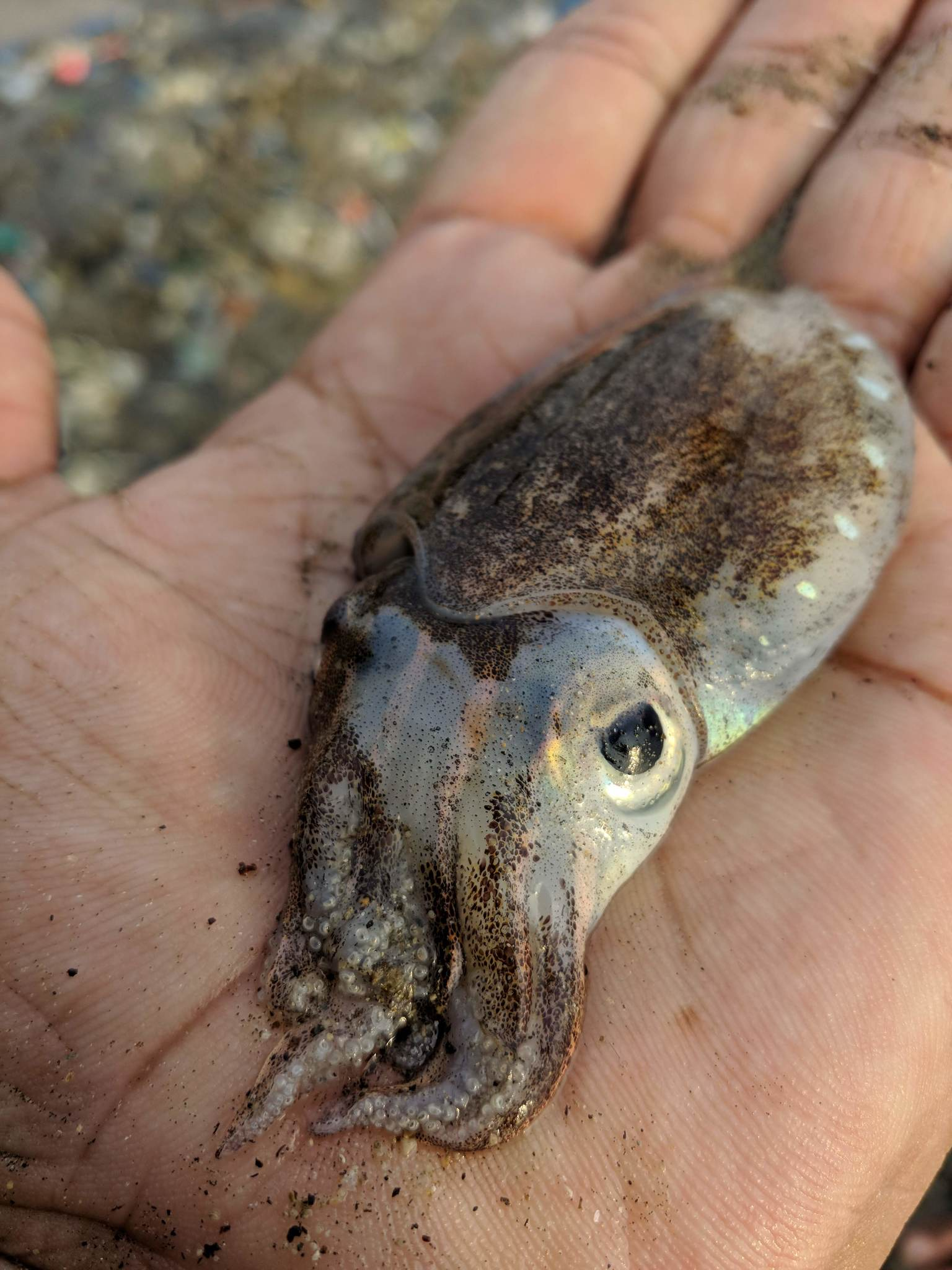
- Cuttlefish from multiple genera

Scientific classification
- Kingdom: Animalia
- Phylum: Mollusca
- Class: Cephalopoda
- Order: Sepiida
- Superfamily: Sepioidea
- Family: Sepiidae; Leach, 1817

Genera
- Acanthosepion; Ascarosepion; Aurosepina; Decorisepia; Digitosepia; Doratosepion; Erythalassa; Hemisepius; Lusepia; Rhombosepion; Sepia; Sepiella; Spathidosepion

= Cuttlefish =

Cuttlefish Temporal range: Miocene – Recent

Family of demersal cephalopod

Cuttlefish, or cuttles, are marine molluscs of the family Sepiidae. They belong to the class Cephalopoda which also includes squid, octopuses, and nautiluses. Cuttlefish have a unique internal shell, the cuttlebone, which is used for control of buoyancy. They have large, W-shaped pupils, eight arms, and two tentacles furnished with denticulated suckers, with which they secure their prey. They generally range in size from 15 to 25 cm (6 to 10 in), with the largest species, the giant cuttlefish (Sepia apama), reaching 50 cm (20 in) in mantle length and more than 10.5 kg (23 lb) in mass.

Cuttlefish eat small molluscs, crabs, shrimp, fish, octopuses and other cuttlefish. Their predators include dolphins, larger fish (including sharks), seals, seabirds, and other cuttlefish. The typical life expectancy of a cuttlefish is about 1–2 years. Studies are said to indicate cuttlefish to be among the most intelligent invertebrates. Cuttlefish also have one of the largest brain-to-body size ratios of all invertebrates.

The Greco-Roman world valued the cuttlefish as a source of the unique brown pigment the creature releases from its siphon when it is alarmed. The word for the cuttlefish in both Greek and Latin, sepia, now refers to the reddish-brown color sepia in English.

== Nomenclature ==
The "cuttle" in "cuttlefish", which is itself sometimes used to refer to these animals, is derived from the Old English name for the group, cudele. The word may be cognate with the Old Norse koddi (cushion) and the Middle Low German Kudel (rag).

=== Taxonomy ===
One hundred sixteen species of cuttlefish are currently recognized; for decades, the classification of this family relied on just three genera: Metasepia, Sepia, and Sepiella, with Sepia containing most of the species and several subgenera. A 2023 paper shifted this perception by having recovered Sepia as containing several monophyletic groups or clades. The authors subsequently revived several synonymized genera and elevated some subgenera of Sepia to full genus level, reassigning many species of Sepia to these revived genera. Conversely, Metasepia was found to nest within one of these revived genera, and as it was named after Ascarosepion it became a junior synonym of that genus.

Maximum likelihood phylogenetic tree from Lupše et al. 2023

- Sepiidae
  - - Acanthosepion
    - Ascarosepion (incl. Metasepia)
  - - - Sepiella
      - Sepia sensu stricto
    - - Rhombosepion
      - - Spathidosepion
        - - - - Doratosepion
              - Aurosepina
            - Erythalassa
          - - Decorisepia
            - - Digitosepia
              - Lusepia

Sepia bertheloti was also analyzed, but its position within this analysis was poorly resolved.

The genera and species of Sepiidae is as follows:

- Order Sepiida
  - Suborder Sepiina
    - Superfamily †Vasseurioidea
    - Superfamily Sepioidea
      - Family †Anomalosaepiidae Yancey & Garvie, 2011
      - Family †Belosaepiidae Dixon, 1850
      - Family Sepiidae
        - Genus Acanthosepion
          - Acanthosepion aculeatum, needle cuttlefish (type)
          - Acanthosepion ellipticum, ovalbone cuttlefish
          - Acanthosepion esculentum, golden cuttlefish
          - Acanthosepion lycidas, kisslip cuttlefish
          - Acanthosepion pharaonis, Pharaoh cuttlefish
          - Acanthosepion ramani
          - Acanthosepion recurvirostrum, curvespine cuttlefish
          - Acanthosepion smithi, Smith's cuttlefish
          - Acanthosepion stelliferum
        - Genus Ascarosepion
          - Ascarosepion apama, giant Australian cuttlefish
          - Ascarosepion bandense, stumpy-spined cuttlefish
          - Ascarosepion cultratum, knifebone cuttlefish
          - Ascarosepion filibrachia
          - Ascarosepion latimanus, broadclub cuttlefish
          - Ascarosepion mestus, reaper cuttlefish (type)
          - Ascarosepion novaehollandiae, New Holland cuttlefish
          - Ascarosepion opipara
          - Ascarosepion papuensis, Papuan cuttlefish
          - Ascarosepion pfefferi, flamboyant cuttlefish
          - Ascarosepion plangon, mourning cuttlefish
          - Ascarosepion rozella, rosecone cuttlefish
          - Ascarosepion tullbergi, paintpot cuttlefish
        - Genus Aurosepina
          - Aurosepina arabica, Arabian cuttlefish
        - Genus Decorisepia
          - Decorisepia australis, southern cuttlefish
          - Decorisepia hedleyi, Hedley's cuttlefish (type)
          - Decorisepia madokai, Madokai's cuttlefish
        - Genus Digitosepia
          - Digitosepia barosei
          - Digitosepia dubia
          - Digitosepia faurei
          - Digitosepia robsoni (type)
          - Digitosepia shazaei
          - Digitosepia roeleveldi
        - Genus Doratosepion
          - Doratosepion andreana, Andrea cuttlefish (type)
          - Sepia braggi, slender cuttlefish
          - Sepia erostrata
          - Sepia foliopeza
          - Doratosepion kobiensis, Kobi cuttlefish
          - Sepia limata
          - Sepia longipes, longarm cuttlefish
          - Sepia lorigera, spider cuttlefish
          - Sepia pardex
          - Sepia peterseni
          - Sepia tenuipes
          - Sepia tokioensis
        - Genus Erythalassa
          - Erythalassa trygonina, trident cuttlefish
        - Genus Hemisepius
          - Hemisepius typicus
        - Genus Lusepia
          - Lusepia hieronis
        - Genus Rhombosepion
          - Rhombosepion elegans, elegant cuttlefish (type)
          - Rhombosepion omani, Oman cuttlefish
          - Rhombosepion orbignyanum, pink cuttlefish
          - Rhombosepion prashadi, hooded cuttlefish
        - Genus Sepia
          - Sepia hierredda
          - Sepia officinalis, common cuttlefish (type)
          - Sepia vermiculata
        - Genus Sepiella
          - Sepiella inermis, spineless cuttlefish
          - Sepiella japonica, Japanese spineless cuttlefish
          - Sepiella ornata, ornate cuttlefish (type, pending confirmation)
        - Genus Spathidosepion
          - Spathidosepion angulatum
          - Spathidosepion papillatum
          - Spathidosepion tuberculatum (type, pending genetic analysis)

The subsequent species are in need of taxonomic review, as they were not examined in the 2023 study.

- ? Sepia bartletti
- ? Sepia baxteri *
- ? Sepia dannevigi *
- ? Sepia whitleyana
- Sepia acuminata
- Sepia adami
- Sepia appelloefi
- Sepia aureomaculata
- Sepia bathyalis
- Sepia bertheloti, African cuttlefish
- Sepia bidhaia
- Sepia brevimana, shortclub cuttlefish
- Sepia burnupi
- Sepia carinata
- Sepia chirotrema
- Sepia confusa
- Sepia cottoni
- Sepia dollfusi
- Sepia elongata
- Sepia elobyana, Guinean cuttlefish
- Sepia filibrachia
- Sepia furcata
- Sepia gibba
- Sepia grahami
- Sepia hirunda
- Sepia incerta
- Sepia insignis
- Sepia irvingi
- Sepia ivanovi
- Sepia joubini
- Sepia kiensis *
- Sepia koilados
- Sepia mascarensis
- Sepia mira
- Sepia mirabilis
- Sepia murrayi, frog cuttlefish
- Sepia plana
- Sepia plathyconchalis
- Sepia prabahari
- Sepia pulchra
- Sepia reesi
- Sepia rex
- Sepia rhoda
- Sepia savignyi, broadback cuttlefish
- Sepia saya
- Sepia senta
- Sepia sewelli
- Sepia simoniana
- Sepia sokotriensis
- Sepia subplana
- Sepia subtenuipes
- Sepia sulcata, grooved cuttlefish
- Sepia tala
- Sepia tanybracheia
- Sepia thurstoni
- Sepia vecchioni
- Sepia vercoi
- Sepia vietnamica
- Sepia vossi
- Sepiella weberi
- Sepia zanzibarica
- Sepiella cyanea
- Sepiella mangkangunga
- Sepiella ocellata

The species listed above with an asterisk (*) are questionable and need further study to determine if they are a valid species or a synonym. The question mark (?) indicates questionable placement within the genus.

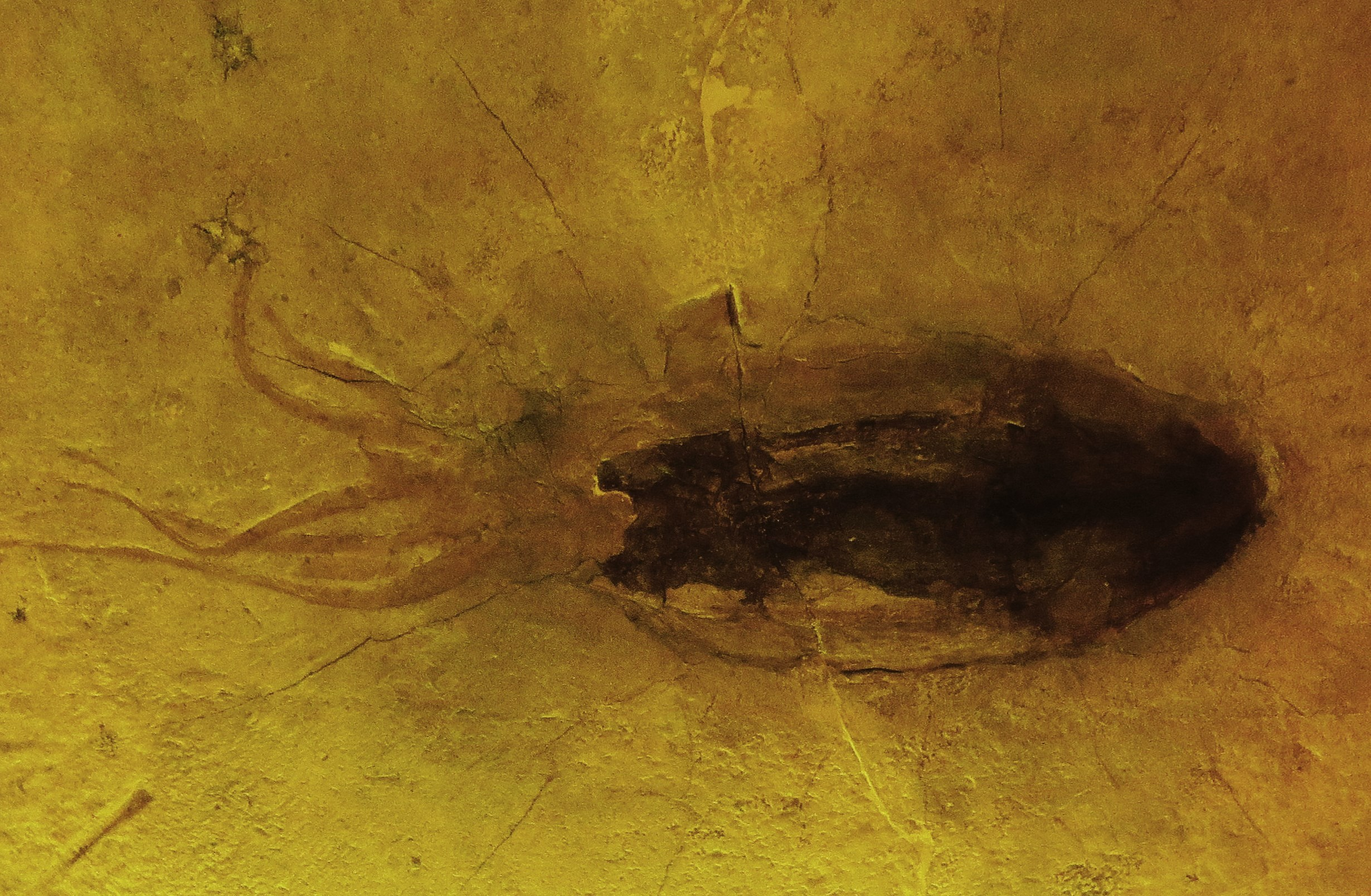
Trachyteuthis hastiformis; Museum of Nature and Archaeology

=== Fossil record ===
The earliest fossils of cuttlefish are from the end of the Cretaceous period, represented by Ceratisepia from the Late Maastrichtian Maastricht Formation of the Netherlands. Although the Jurassic Trachyteuthis was historically considered possibly related to cuttlefish, later studies considered it to be more closely related to octopuses and vampire squids.

The following fossil genera are recognized:

- Archaeosepia Szörényi, 1934
- Notosepia F. Chapman, 1915

== Description ==
=== Cuttlebone ===
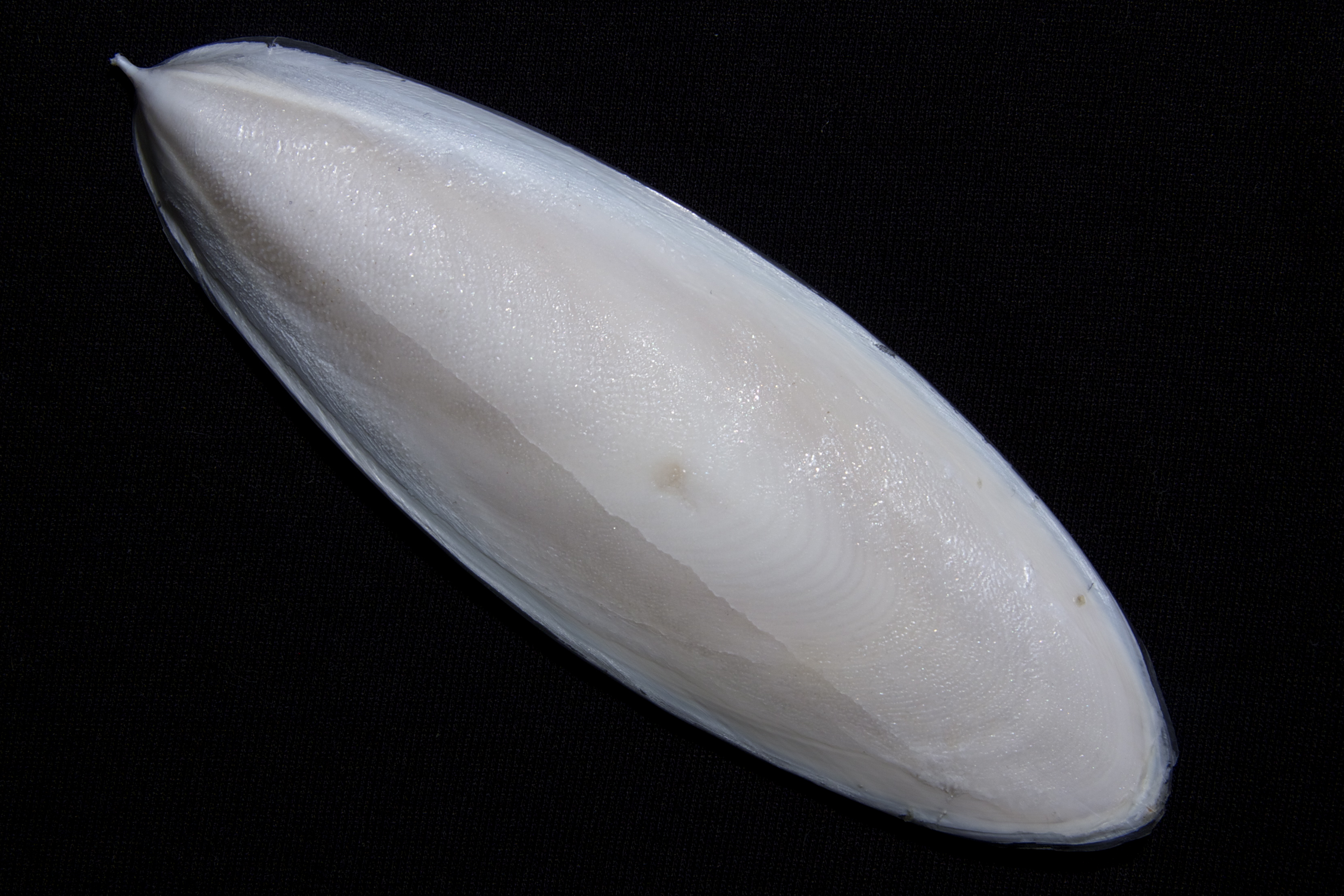
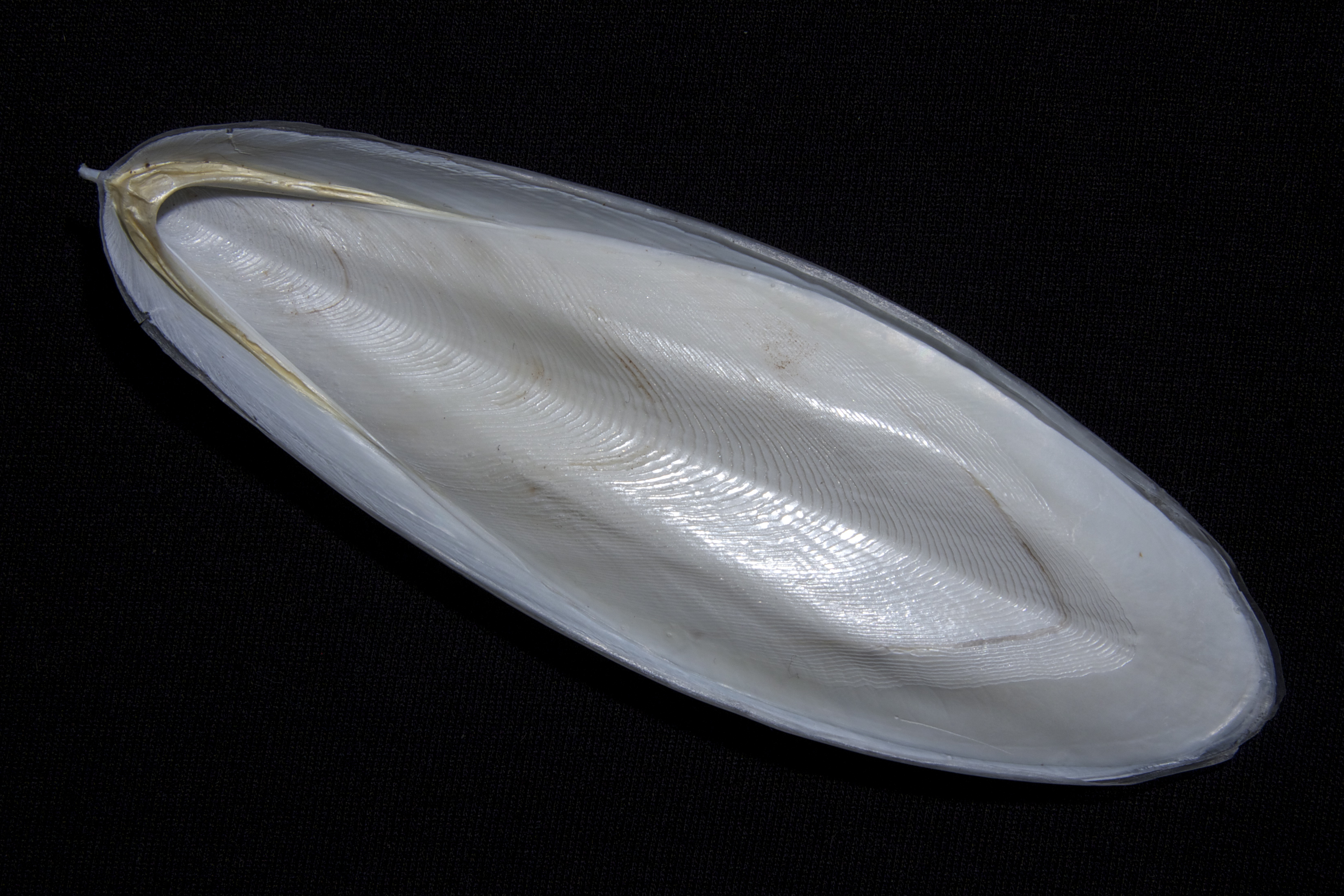
Top and bottom view of a cuttlebone, the buoyancy organ and internal shell of a cuttlefish

Unlike other cephalopods, cuttlefish possess a unique internal structure called the cuttlebone, a highly modified internal shell, which is porous and is made of aragonite. Except for Spirula, they are the only coleoid cephalopods with a shell with a phragmocone divided into chambers separated by septa. The pores provide it with buoyancy, which the cuttlefish regulates by changing the gas-to-liquid ratio in the chambered cuttlebone via the ventral siphuncle. Each species' cuttlebone has a distinct shape, size, and pattern of ridges or texture. The cuttlebone is unique to cuttlefish, and is one of the features that distinguish them from their squid relatives.

=== Visual system ===
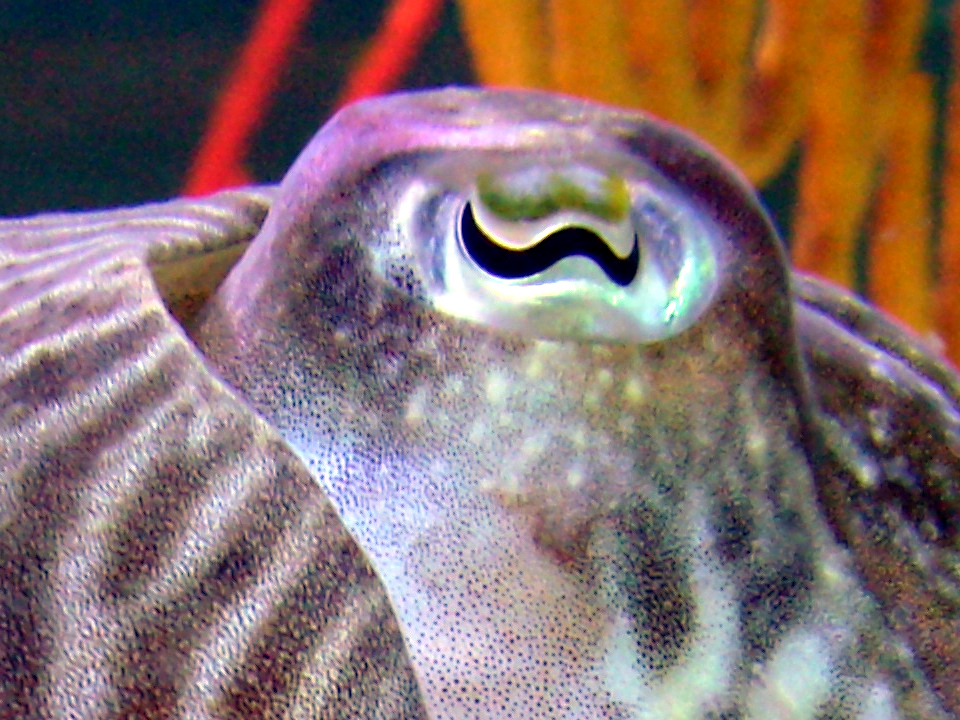
The characteristic W-shape of the cuttlefish eye

Pupil expansion in Sepia officinalis

Cuttlefish, like other cephalopods, have sophisticated eyes. The organogenesis and the final structure of the cephalopod eye fundamentally differ from those of vertebrates, such as humans. Superficial similarities between cephalopod and vertebrate eyes are thought to be examples of convergent evolution. The cuttlefish pupil is a smoothly curving W-shape. Although cuttlefish cannot see color, they can perceive the polarization of light, which enhances their perception of contrast. They have two spots of concentrated sensor cells on their retinas (known as foveae), one to look more forward, and one to look more backward. The eye changes focus by shifting the position of the entire lens with respect to the retina, instead of reshaping the lens as in mammals. Unlike the vertebrate eye, no blind spot exists, because the optic nerve is positioned behind the retina. They are capable of using stereopsis, enabling them to discern depth/distance because their brain calculates the input from both eyes.

The cuttlefish's eyes are thought to be fully developed before birth, and they start observing their surroundings while still in the egg. In consequence, they may prefer to hunt the prey they saw before hatching.

=== Arms and mantle cavity ===
Cuttlefish have eight arms and two additional elongated tentacles that are used to grasp prey. The elongated tentacles and mantle cavity serve as defense mechanisms; when approached by a predator, the cuttlefish can suck water into its mantle cavity and spread its arms in order to appear larger than normal. Though the mantle cavity is used for jet propulsion, the main parts of the body that are used for basic mobility are the fins, which can maneuver the cuttlefish in all directions.

=== Suckers ===
The suckers of cuttlefish extend most of the length of their arms and along the distal portion of their tentacles. Like other cephalopods, cuttlefish have "taste-by-touch" sensitivity in their suckers, allowing them to discriminate among objects and water currents that they contact.

=== Circulatory system ===
The blood of a cuttlefish is an unusual shade of green-blue, because it uses the copper-containing protein hemocyanin to carry oxygen instead of the red, iron-containing protein hemoglobin found in vertebrates' blood. The blood is pumped by three separate hearts: two branchial hearts pump blood to the cuttlefish's pair of gills (one heart for each), and the third pumps blood around the rest of the body. Cuttlefish blood must flow more rapidly than that of most other animals because hemocyanin carries substantially less oxygen than hemoglobin. Unlike most other mollusks, cephalopods like cuttlefish have a closed circulatory system.

=== Ink ===
Like other marine mollusks, cuttlefish have ink stores that are used for chemical deterrence, phagomimicry, sensory distraction, and evasion when attacked. Its composition results in a dark colored ink, rich in ammonium salts and amino acids that may have a role in phagomimicry defenses. The ink can be ejected to create a "smoke screen" to hide the cuttlefish's escape, or it can be released as a pseudomorph of similar size to the cuttlefish, acting as a decoy while the cuttlefish swims away.

Human use of this substance is wide-ranged. A common use is in cooking with squid ink to darken and flavor rice and pasta. It adds a black tint and a sweet flavor to the food. In addition to food, cuttlefish ink can be used with plastics and staining of materials. The diverse composition of cuttlefish ink, and its deep complexity of colors, allows for dilution and modification of its color. Cuttlefish ink can be used to make noniridescent reds, blues, and greens, subsequently used for biomimetic colors and materials.

=== Poison and venom ===
A common gene between cuttlefish and almost all other cephalopods allows them to produce venom, excreting it through their beak to help kill their prey. Additionally, the muscles of the flamboyant cuttlefish (Metasepa pfefferi) contain tetrodotoxin which is found to be the same as the blue-ringed octopus. It is as lethal as the venom of fellow cephalopod, the blue-ringed octopus. However, this toxin is found only in the muscle and is not injected in any form, classifying it as poisonous, not venomous.

=== Chromatic cells ===
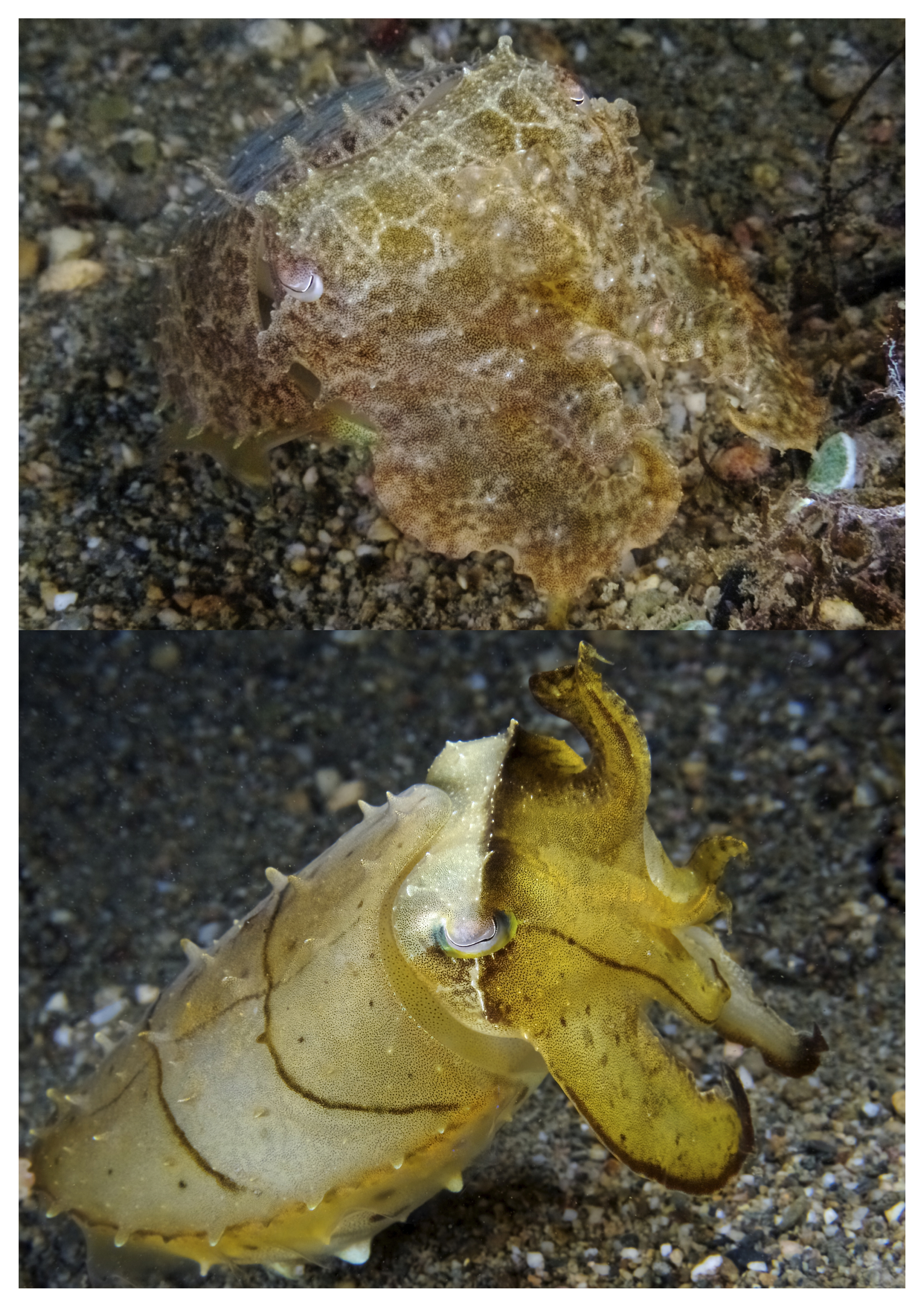
This broadclub cuttlefish (Ascarosepion latimanus) can change from camouflage tans and browns (top) to yellow with dark highlights (bottom) in less than one second.

Cuttlefish are sometimes referred to as the "chameleons of the sea" because of their ability to rapidly alter their skin color – this can occur within one second. Cuttlefish change color and pattern (including the polarization of the reflected light waves), and the shape of the skin to communicate to other cuttlefish, to camouflage themselves, and as a deimatic display to warn off potential predators. Under some circumstances, cuttlefish can be trained to change color in response to stimuli, thereby indicating their color changing is not completely innate.

Cuttlefish can also affect the light's polarization, which can be used to signal to other marine animals, many of which can also sense polarization, as well as being able to influence the color of light as it reflects off their skin. Although cuttlefish (and most other cephalopods) lack color vision, high-resolution polarisation vision may provide an alternative mode of receiving contrast information that is just as defined. The cuttlefish's wide pupil may accentuate chromatic aberration, allowing it to perceive color by focusing specific wavelengths onto the retina.

The three broad categories of color patterns are uniform, mottle, and disruptive. Cuttlefish can display as many as 12 to 14 patterns, 13 of which have been categorized as seven "acute" (relatively brief) and six "chronic" (long-lasting) patterns. although other researchers suggest the patterns occur on a continuum.

Patterns of the common cuttlefish
Chronic	Acute
Uniform light	Uniform blanching
Stipple	Uniform darkening
Light mottle	Acute disruptive
Disruptive	Deimatic
Dark mottle	Flamboyant
Weak zebra	Intense zebra
	Passing cloud

The color-changing ability of cuttlefish is due to multiple types of cells. These are arranged (from the skin's surface going deeper) as pigmented chromatophores above a layer of reflective iridophores and below them, leucophores.

==== Chromatophores ====
Chromatophores are sacs containing hundreds of thousands of pigment granules and a large membrane that is folded when retracted. Hundreds of muscles radiate from the chromatophore. These are under neural control and when they expand, they reveal the hue of the pigment contained in the sac. Cuttlefish have three types of chromatophore: yellow/orange (the uppermost layer), red, and brown/black (the deepest layer). The cuttlefish can control the contraction and relaxation of the muscles around individual chromatophores, thereby opening or closing the elastic sacs and allowing different levels of pigment to be exposed. Furthermore, the chromatophores contain luminescent protein nanostructures in which tethered pigment granules modify light through absorbance, reflection, and fluorescence between 650 and 720 nm.

For cephalopods in general, the hues of the pigment granules are relatively constant within a species, but can vary slightly between species. For example, the common cuttlefish and the opalescent inshore squid (Doryteuthis opalescens) have yellow, red, and brown, the European common squid (Alloteuthis subulata) has yellow and red, and the common octopus has yellow, orange, red, brown, and black.

In cuttlefish, activation of a chromatophore can expand its surface area by 500%. Up to 200 chromatophores per mm^{2} of skin may occur. In Loligo plei, an expanded chromatophore may be up to 1.5 mm in diameter, but when retracted, it can measure as little as 0.1 mm.

==== Iridophores ====
Retracting the chromatophores reveals the iridophores and leucophores beneath them, thereby allowing cuttlefish to use another modality of visual signalling brought about by structural coloration.

Iridophores are structures that produce iridescent colors with a metallic sheen. They reflect light using plates of crystalline chemochromes made from guanine. When illuminated, they reflect iridescent colors because of the diffraction of light within the stacked plates. Orientation of the chemochromes determines the nature of the color observed. By using biochromes as colored filters, iridophores create an optical effect known as Tyndall or Rayleigh scattering, producing bright blue or blue-green colors. Iridophores vary in size, but are generally smaller than 1 mm. Squid at least are able to change their iridescence. This takes several seconds or minutes, and the mechanism is not understood. However, iridescence can also be altered by expanding and retracting the chromatophores above the iridophores. Because chromatophores are under direct neural control from the brain, this effect can be immediate.

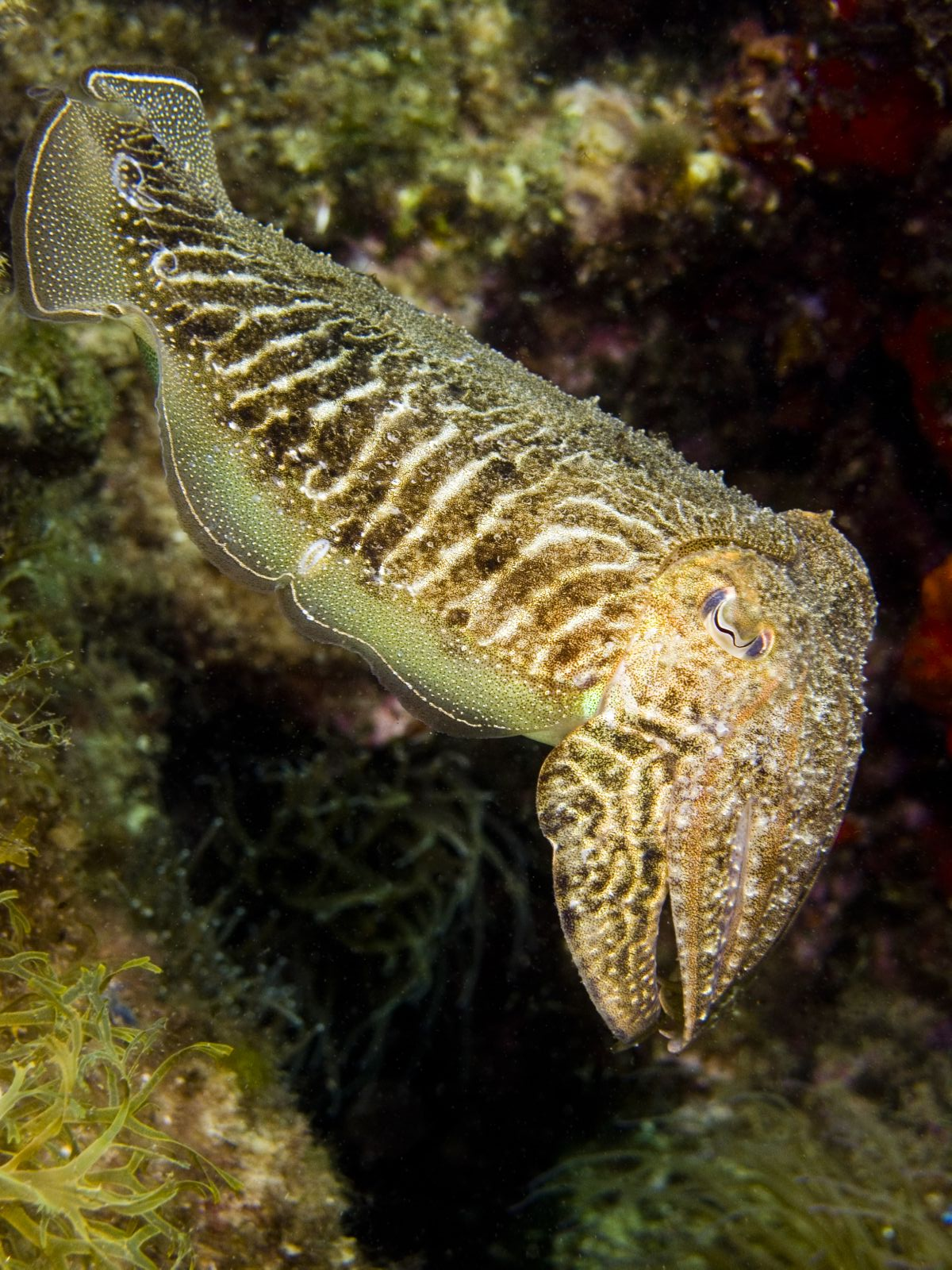
The white spots and bands on this cuttlefish are produced by leucophores.

Cephalopod iridophores polarize light. Cephalopods have a rhabdomeric visual system which means they are visually sensitive to polarized light. Cuttlefish use their polarization vision when hunting for silvery fish (their scales polarize light). Female cuttlefish exhibit a greater number of polarized light displays than males and also alter their behavior when responding to polarized patterns. The use of polarized reflective patterns has led some to suggest that cephalopods may communicate intraspecifically in a mode that is "hidden" or "private" because many of their predators are insensitive to polarized light.

==== Leucophores ====
Leucophores, usually located deeper in the skin than iridophores, are also structural reflectors using crystalline purines, often guanine, to reflect light. Unlike iridophores, however, leucophores have more organized crystals that reduce diffraction. Given a source of white light, they produce a white shine, in red they produce red, and in blue they produce blue. Leucophores assist in camouflage by providing light areas during background matching (e.g. by resembling light-colored objects in the environment) and disruptive coloration (by making the body appear to be composed of high-contrasting patches).

The reflectance spectra of cuttlefish patterns and several natural substrates (stipple, mottle, disruptive) can be measured using an optic spectrometer.

== Biology ==
=== Behavior ===
Video of S. mestus in Sydney waters, hunting and catching prey

While the preferred diet of cuttlefish is crabs and fish, they feed on small shrimp shortly after hatching.

==== Sleep-like behavior ====
Sleep is a state of immobility characterized by being rapidly reversible, homeostatically controlled, and increasing an organism's arousal threshold. One cephalopod species, Octopus vulgaris, has been shown to satisfy these criteria. Another species, Sepia officinalis, satisfies two of the three criteria but has not yet been tested on the third (arousal threshold). Recent research shows that the sleep-like state in a common species of cuttlefish, Sepia officinalis, shows predictable periods of rapid eye movement, arm twitching and rapid chromatophore changes.

=== Communication ===
Cephalopods are able to communicate visually using a diverse range of signals. To produce these signals, cephalopods can vary four types of communication element: chromatic (skin coloration), skin texture (e.g. rough or smooth), posture, and locomotion. The common cuttlefish can display 34 chromatic, six textural, eight postural and six locomotor elements, whereas flamboyant cuttlefish use between 42 and 75 chromatic, 14 postural, and seven textural and locomotor elements.

Visual signals of the common cuttlefish
Chromic – light	Chromic – dark	Texture	Posture	Locomotor
White posterior triangle	Anterior transverse mantle line	Smooth skin	Raised arms	Sitting
White square	Posterior transverse mantle line	Coarse skin	Waving arms	Bottom suction
White mantle bar	Anterior mantle bar	Papillate skin	Splayed arms	Buried
White lateral stripe	Posterior mantle bar	Wrinkled first arms	Drooping arms	Hovering
White fin spots	Paired mantle spots	White square papillae	Extended fourth arm	Jetting
White fin line	Median mantle stripe	Major lateral papillae	Flattened body	Inking
White neck spots	Mantle margin stripe		Raised head	
Iridescent ventral mantle	Mantle margin scalloping		Flanged fin	
White zebra bands	Dark fin line			
White landmark spots	Black zebra bands			
White splotches	Mottle			
White major lateral papillae	Lateroventral patches			
White head bar	Anterior head bar			
White arm triangle	Posterior head bar			
Pink iridophore arm stripes	Pupil			
White arms spots (males only)	Eye ring			
Dark arm stripes				
Dark arms				

==== Intraspecific ====
Cuttlefish sometimes use their color patterns to signal future intent to other cuttlefish. For example, during agonistic encounters, male cuttlefish adopt a pattern called the intense zebra pattern, considered to be an honest signal. If a male is intending to attack, it adopts a "dark face" change, otherwise, it remains pale.

In at least one species, female cuttlefish react to their own reflection in a mirror and to other females by displaying a body pattern called "splotch". However, they do not use this display in response to males, inanimate objects, or prey. This indicates they are able to discriminate same-sex conspecifics, even when human observers are unable to discern the sex of a cuttlefish in the absence of sexual dimorphism.

Female cuttlefish signal their receptivity to mating using a display called precopulatory grey. Male cuttlefish sometimes use deception toward guarding males to mate with females. Small males hide their sexually dimorphic fourth arms, change their skin pattern to the mottled appearance of females, and change the shape of their arms to mimic those of nonreceptive, egg-laying females.

Displays on one side of a cuttlefish can be independent of the other side of the body; males can display courtship signals to females on one side while simultaneously showing female-like displays with the other side to stop rival males interfering with their courtship.

==== Interspecific ====
The deimatic display (a rapid change to black and white with dark 'eyespots' and contour, and spreading of the body and fins) is used to startle small fish that are unlikely to prey on the cuttlefish, but use the flamboyant display towards larger, more dangerous fish, and give no display at all to chemosensory predators such as crabs and dogfish.

One dynamic pattern shown by cuttlefish is dark mottled waves apparently repeatedly moving down the body of the animals. This has been called the passing cloud pattern. In the common cuttlefish, this is primarily observed during hunting, and is thought to communicate to potential prey – "stop and watch me" – which some have interpreted as a type of "hypnosis".. However, recent research indicates that motion camouflage is the more likely explanation. This pattern is believed to be centrally generated by (or near) chromatophore motoneurons.

=== Camouflage ===
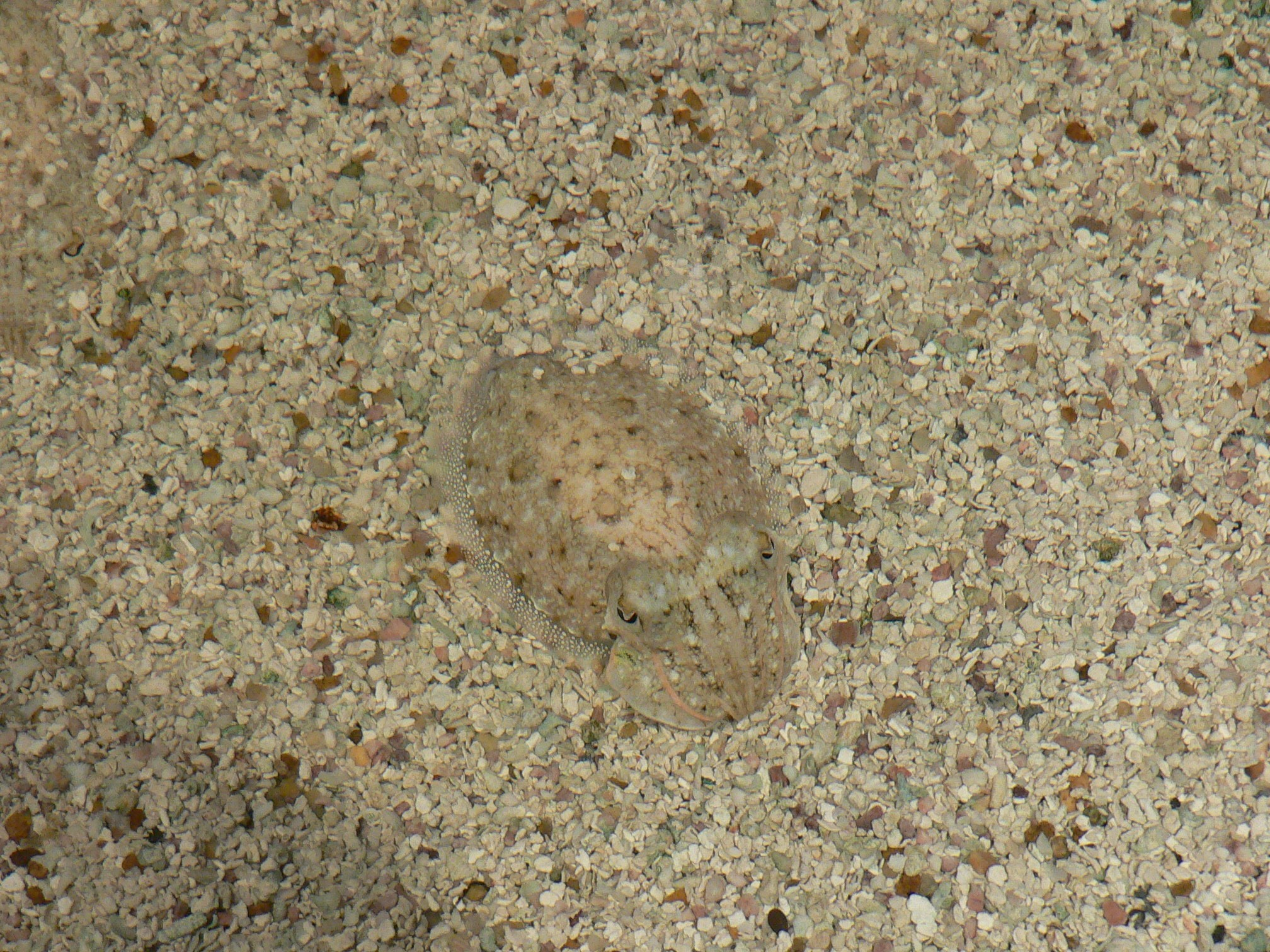
Juvenile cuttlefish camouflaged against the seafloor

Cuttlefish are able to rapidly change the color of their skin to match their surroundings and create chromatically complex patterns, despite their inability to perceive color, through some mechanism which is not completely understood. They have been seen to have the ability to assess their surroundings and match the color, contrast and texture of the substrate even in nearly total darkness.

The color variations in the mimicked substrate and animal skin are similar. Depending on the species, the skin of cuttlefish responds to substrate changes in distinctive ways. By changing naturalistic backgrounds, the camouflage responses of different species can be measured. Sepia officinalis changes color to match the substrate by disruptive patterning (contrast to break up the outline), whereas S. pharaonis matches the substrate by blending in. Although camouflage is achieved in different ways, and in an absence of color vision, both species change their skin colors to match the substrate. Cuttlefish adapt their own camouflage pattern in ways that are specific for a particular habitat. An animal could settle in the sand and appear one way, with another animal a few feet away in a slightly different microhabitat, settled in algae for example, will be camouflaged quite differently.

Cuttlefish are also able to change the texture of their skin. The skin contains bands of circular muscle which as they contract, push fluid up. These can be seen as little spikes, bumps, or flat blades. This can help with camouflage when the cuttlefish becomes texturally as well as chromatically similar to objects in its environment such as kelp or rocks.

=== Lifecycle ===
The lifespan of a cuttlefish is typically around one to two years, depending on the species. They hatch fully developed around 6 mm (1/4 in) long from eggs, reaching around 25 mm (1 in) after the first two months. Before death, cuttlefish go through senescence, when the cephalopod essentially deteriorates or rots in place. Their eyesight begins to fail, which directly impacts their ability to move and hunt efficiently. Once this process begins, cuttlefish tend not to live long due to predation by other organisms.

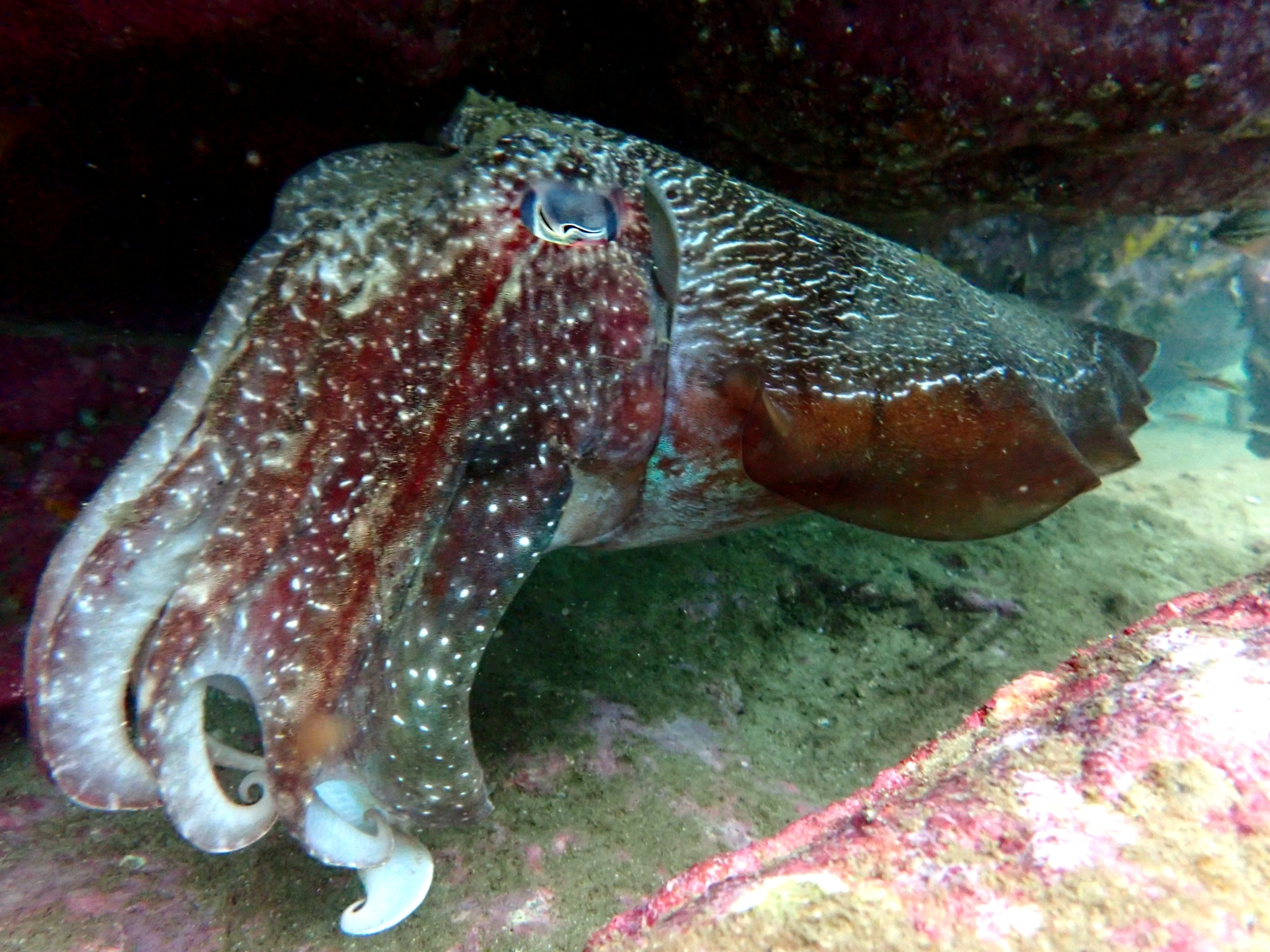
The giant cuttlefish (Ascarosepion apama). The males compete in groups over females.

Cuttlefish start to actively mate at around five months of age. Male cuttlefish challenge one another for dominance and the best den during mating season. During this challenge, no direct contact is usually made—‌rather, the animals threaten each other until one of them backs down and swims away. Eventually, the larger male cuttlefish mate with the females by grabbing them with their tentacles, turning the female so that the two animals are face-to-face, then using a specialized tentacle to insert sperm sacs into an opening near the female's mouth. As males can also use their funnels to flush others' sperm out of the female's pouch, the male then guards the female until she lays the eggs a few hours later. After laying her cluster of eggs, the female cuttlefish secretes ink on them, making them look very similar to grapes. The egg case is produced through a complex capsule of the female accessory genital glands and the ink bag.

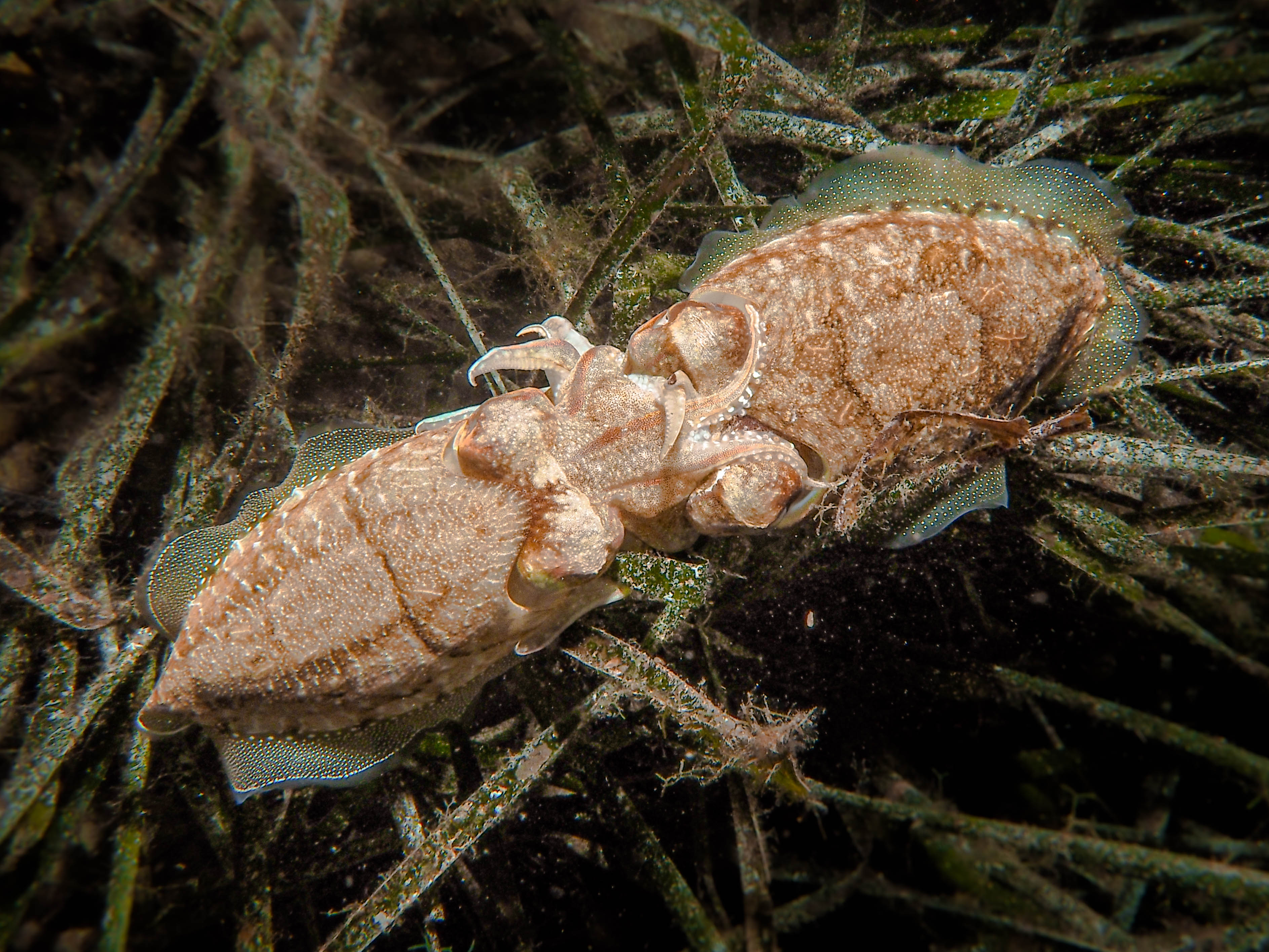
Mating Sepia officinalis

On occasion, a large competitor arrives to threaten the male cuttlefish. In these instances, the male first attempts to intimidate the other male. If the competitor does not flee, the male eventually attacks it to force it away. The cuttlefish that can paralyze the other first, by forcing it near its mouth, wins the fight and the female. Since typically four or five (and sometimes as many as 10) males are available for every female, this behavior is inevitable.

Cuttlefish are indeterminate growers, so smaller cuttlefish always have a chance of finding a mate the next year when they are bigger. Additionally, cuttlefish unable to win in a direct confrontation with a guard male have been observed employing several other tactics to acquire a mate. The most successful of these methods is camouflage; smaller cuttlefish use their camouflage abilities to disguise themselves as a female cuttlefish. Changing their body color, and even pretending to be holding an egg sack, disguised males are able to swim past the larger guard male and mate with the female.

== Range and habitat ==
A cuttlefish in its natural habitat

The family Sepiidae, which contains all cuttlefish, inhabits tropical and temperate ocean waters. They are mostly shallow-water animals, although they are known to go to depths of about 600 m (2,000 ft). They have an unusual biogeographic pattern; they are present along the coasts of East and South Asia, Western Europe, and the Mediterranean, as well as all coasts of Africa and Australia, but are totally absent from the Americas. By the time the family evolved, ostensibly in the Old World, the North Atlantic possibly had become too cold and deep for these warm-water species to cross. The common cuttlefish (Sepia officinalis), is found in the Mediterranean, North and Baltic seas, although populations may occur as far south as South Africa. They are found in sublittoral depths, between the low tide line and the edge of the continental shelf, to about 180 m (600 ft). The cuttlefish is listed under the Red List category of "least concern" by the IUCN Red List of Threatened Species. This means that while some over-exploitation of the marine animal has occurred in some regions due to large-scale commercial fishing, their wide geographic range prevents them from being too threatened. Ocean acidification, however, caused largely by higher levels of carbon dioxide emitted into the atmosphere, is cited as a potential threat. Some studies suggest that ocean acidification does not impair normal embryonic development, survival rates or body size or development of the gonads.

== Human uses ==
=== As food ===
Cuttlefish are caught for food in the Mediterranean, Asia, the English Channel, and elsewhere.

In East Asia, dried, shredded cuttlefish is a popular snack food. In the Qing Dynasty manual of Chinese gastronomy, the Suiyuan shidan, the roe of the cuttlefish, is considered a difficult-to-prepare, but sought-after delicacy. Cuttlefish thick soup is a signature dish in Taiwan.

In Southeast Asia, cuttlefish is a regional dish typical of the Sundanese people in west Java, Indonesia, known as balakutak. The dish is squid stir-fried with various spices and mixed with its ink.

In Sri Lanka, hot butter cuttlefish (batter fried cuttlefish stir fried with butter, chilli flakes, capsicums, and spring onions) is a popular dish that can be found anywhere in the country, usually served as a starter together with drinks.

Cuttlefish are quite popular in Europe. For example, in northeast Italy, they are used in risotto al nero di seppia (risotto with cuttlefish ink), also found in Croatia and Montenegro as crni rižot (black risotto), and in various recipes (either grilled or stewed) often served together with polenta. Catalan cuisine, especially that of the coastal regions, uses cuttlefish and squid ink in a variety of tapas and dishes such as arròs negre. Breaded and deep-fried cuttlefish is a popular dish in Andalusia. In Portugal, cuttlefish is present in many popular dishes. Chocos com tinta (cuttlefish in black ink), for example, is grilled cuttlefish in a sauce of its own ink. Cuttlefish is also popular in the region of Setúbal, where it is served as deep-fried strips or in a variant of feijoada, with white beans. Black pasta is often made using cuttlefish ink.

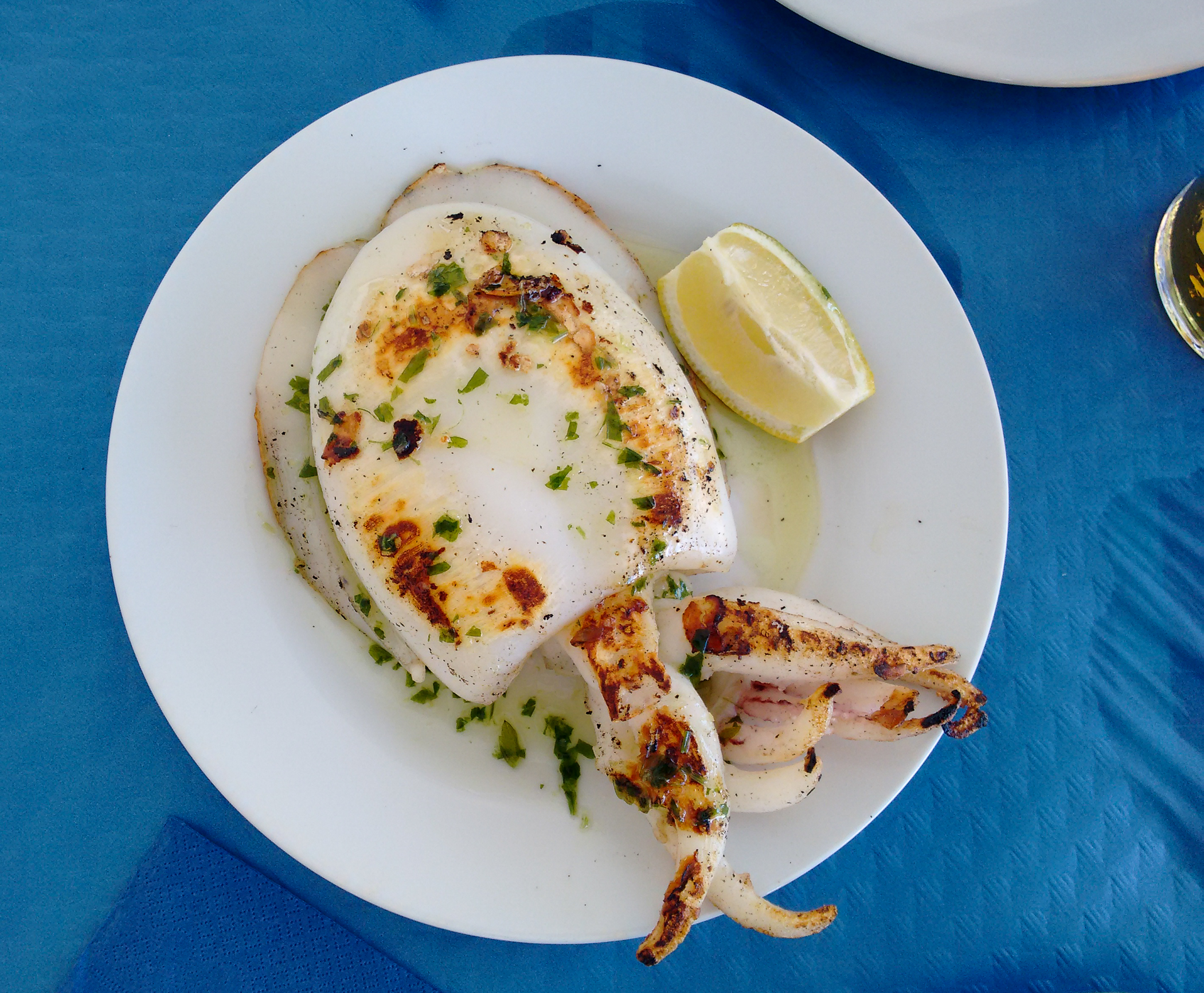
Cuttlefish with lemon (Spain)

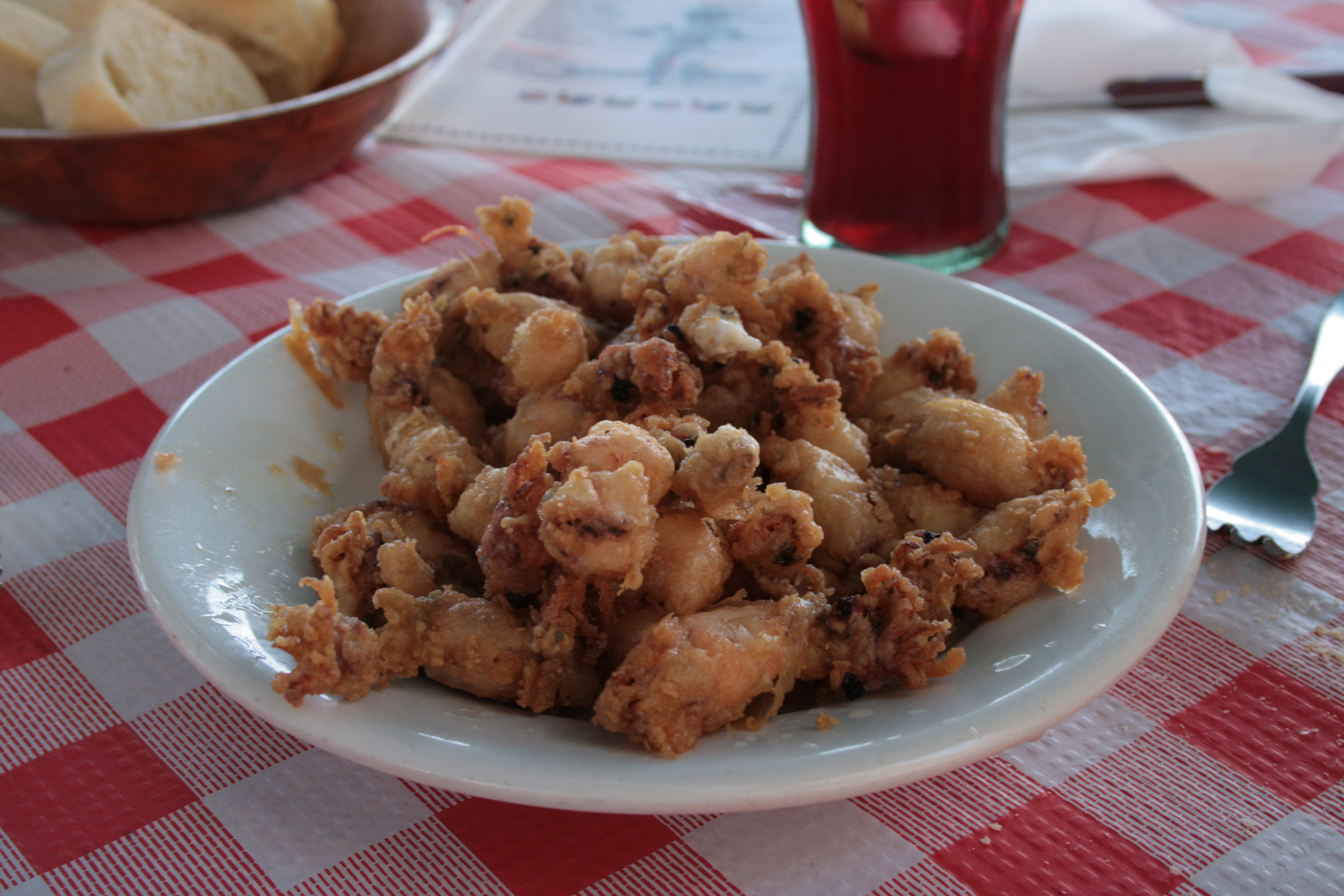
Fried baby cuttlefish (Spain)

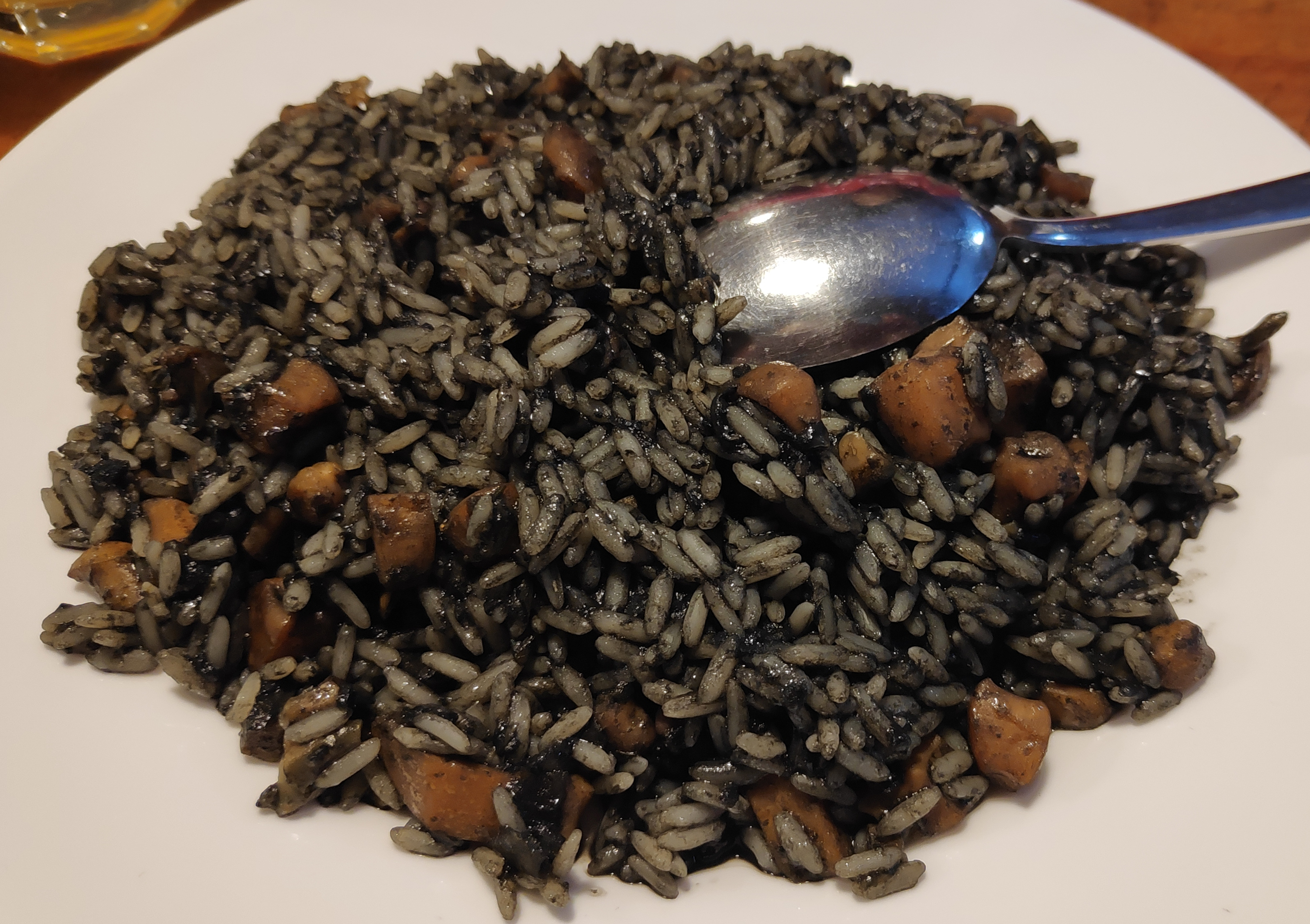
Risotto with cuttlefish ink (Italy)

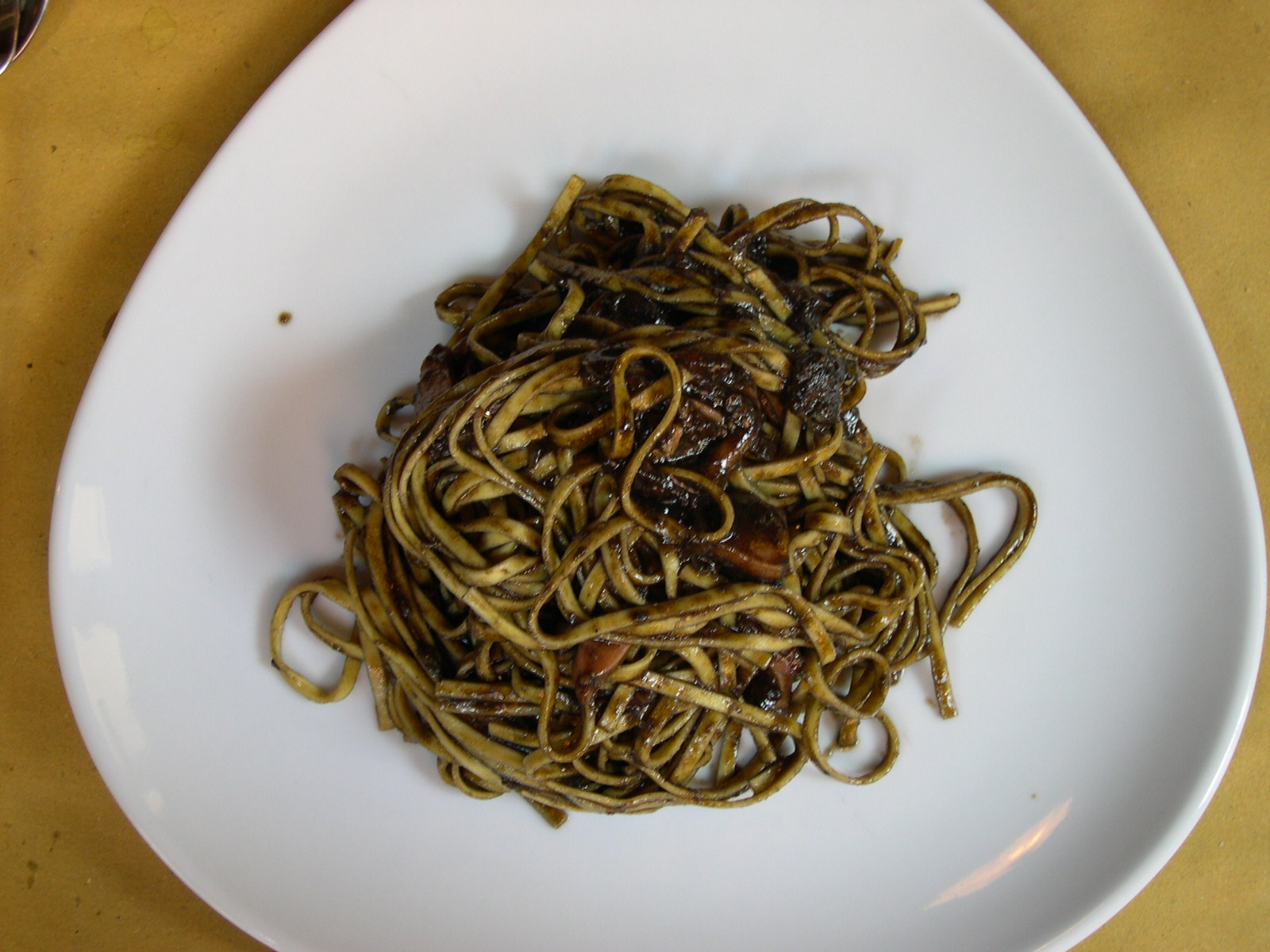
Linguine with cuttlefish and ink sauce (Italy)

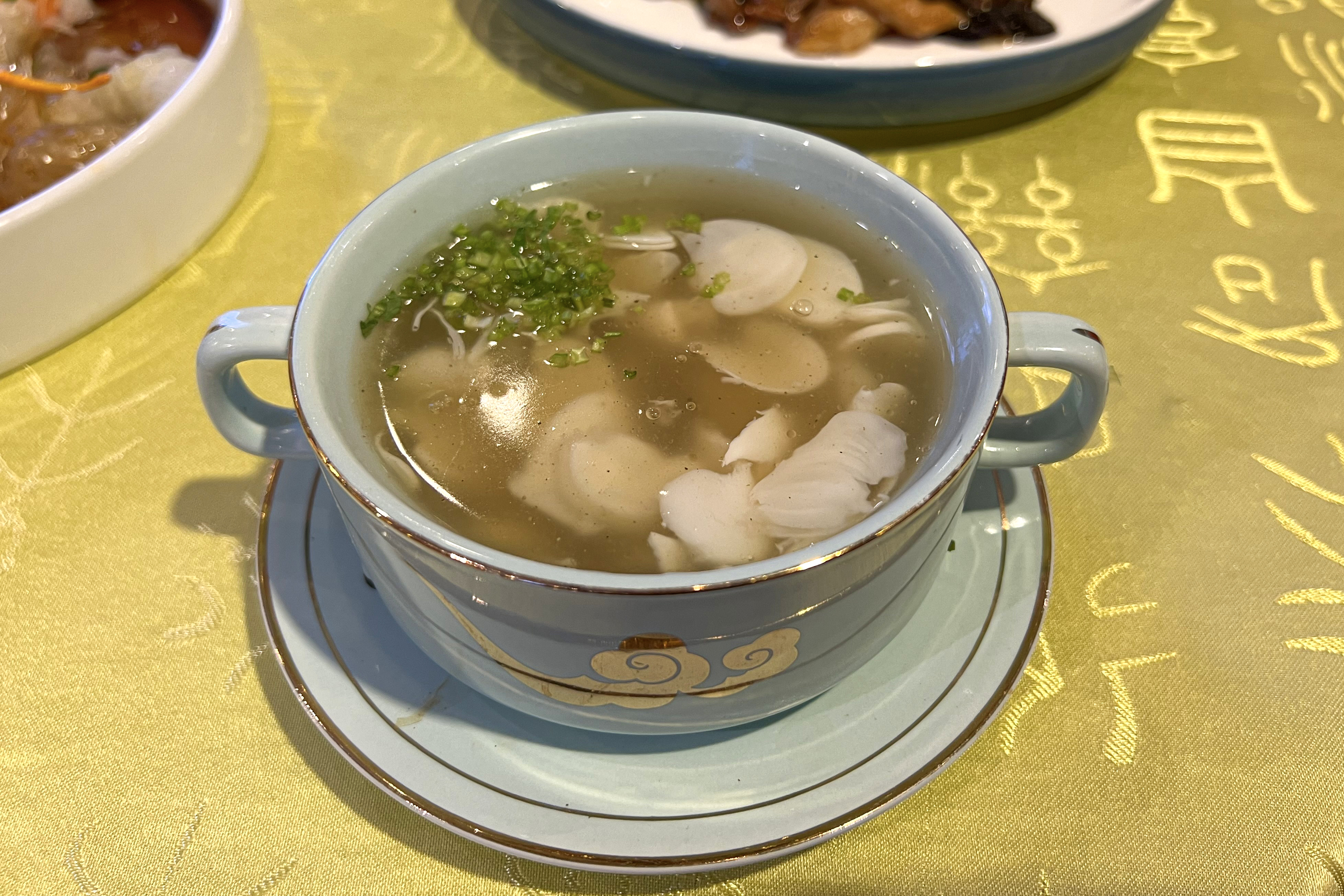
Cuttlefish roe soup (China)

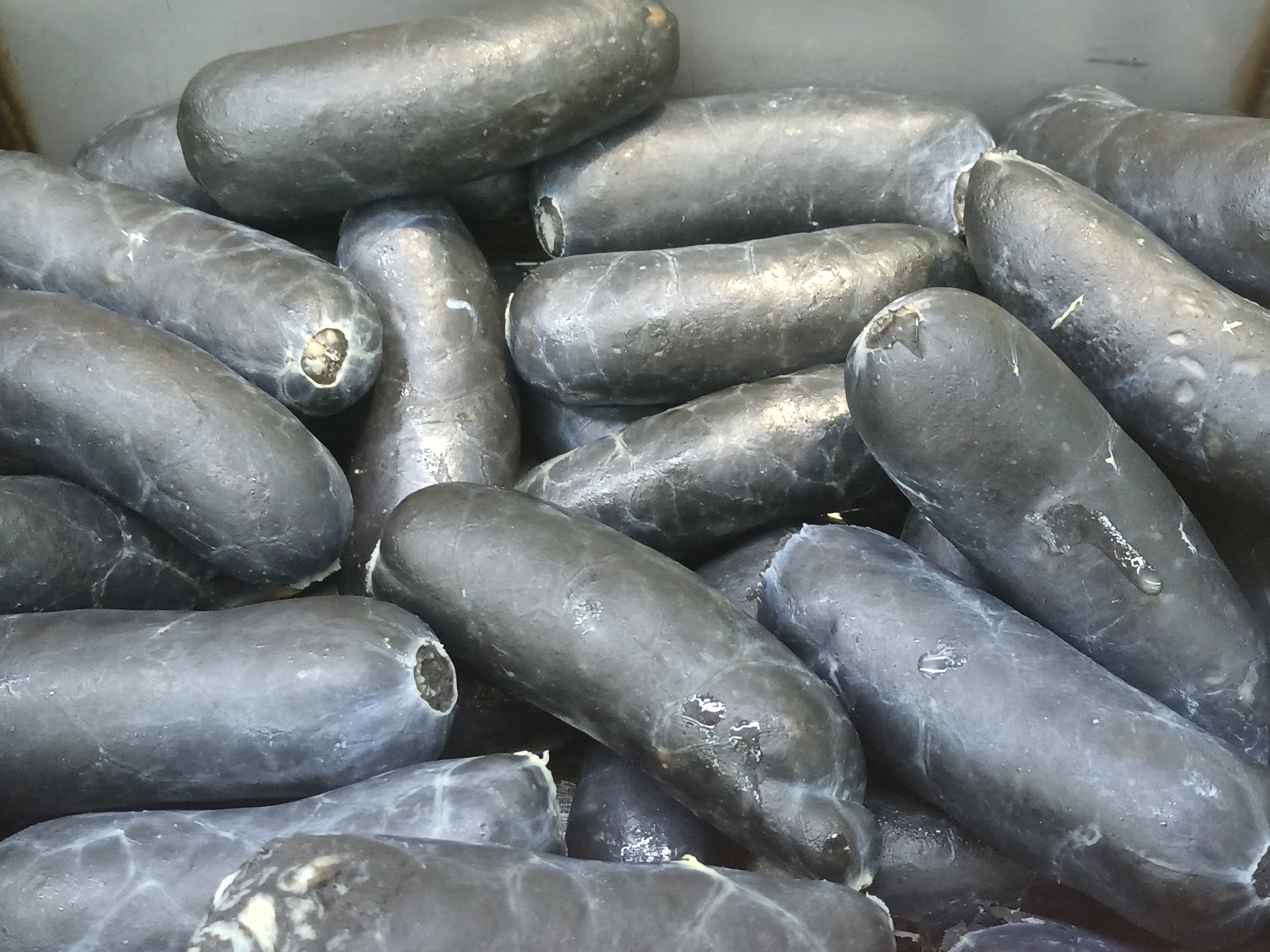
Cuttlefish ink sausages (China)

=== Dye ===
Cuttlefish ink was formerly an important dye, called sepia. To extract the sepia pigment from a cuttlefish (or squid), the ink sac is removed and dried then dissolved in a dilute alkali. The resulting solution is filtered to isolate the pigment, which is then precipitated with dilute hydrochloric acid. The isolated precipitate is the sepia pigment. It is relatively chemically inert, which contributes to its longevity. Today, artificial dyes have mostly replaced natural sepia.

=== Metal casting ===
Cuttlebone has been used since antiquity to make casts for metal. A model is pushed into the cuttlebone and removed, leaving an impression. Molten gold, silver or pewter can then be poured into the cast.

=== Smart clothing ===
Research into replicating biological color-changing has led to engineering artificial chromatophores out of small devices known as dielectric elastomer actuators. Engineers at the University of Bristol have engineered soft materials that mimic the color-changing skin of animals like cuttlefish, paving the way for "smart clothing" and camouflage applications.

=== Pets ===
Though cuttlefish are rarely kept as pets, due in part to their fairly short life expectancy, the most commonly kept are Sepia officinalis and Sepia bandensis. Cuttlefish may fight or even eat each other if there is inadequate tank space for multiple individuals.

== See also ==
- Cephalopod size
