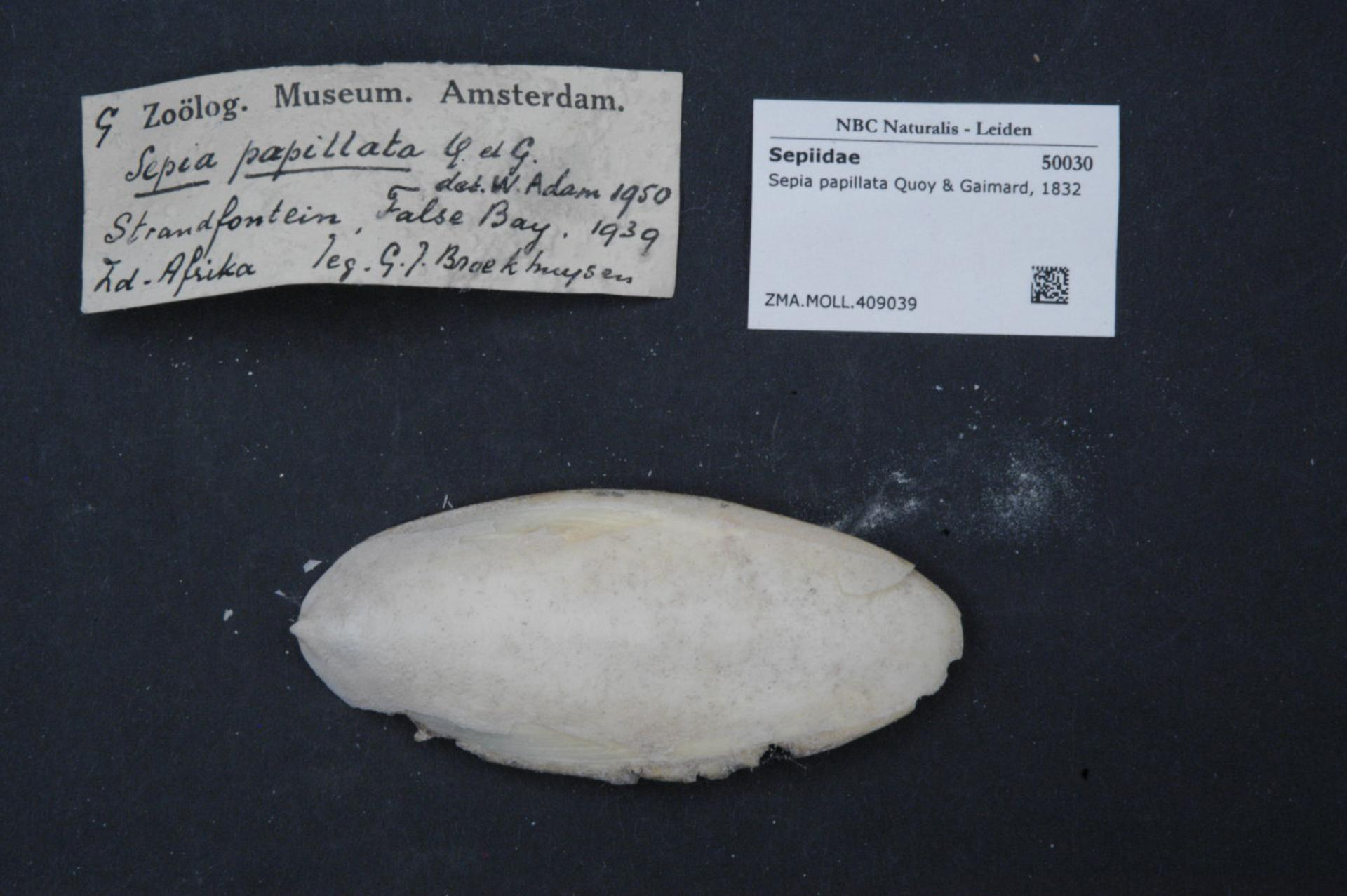
- Sepia papillata shell

Conservation status
- Data Deficient (IUCN 3.1)

Scientific classification
- Kingdom: Animalia
- Phylum: Mollusca
- Class: Cephalopoda
- Order: Sepiida
- Family: Sepiidae
- Genus: Spathidosepion
- Species: S. papillata

Binomial name
- Spathidosepion papillata Quoy & Gaimard, 1832

= Spathidosepion papillatum =

Species of cuttlefish

Spathidosepion papillata is a species of cuttlefish native to the southeastern Atlantic Ocean and southwestern Indian Ocean. Its natural range stretches from Lüderitz Bay, South Africa (26°11′S 15°10′E), to the coast of KwaZulu-Natal off the Tugela and Umvoti Rivers (29°11′S 31°25′E). It is also present in Mascarene Ridge. It lives at depths of between 26 and 210 m.

Spathidosepion papillata grows to a mantle length of 140 mm.

The type specimen was collected near the Cape of Good Hope, South Africa. It is deposited at the Muséum National d'Histoire Naturelle in Paris.
