= Spathidosepion angulatum =

Conservation status
- Data Deficient (IUCN 3.1)

Scientific classification
- Kingdom: Animalia
- Phylum: Mollusca
- Class: Cephalopoda
- Order: Sepiida
- Family: Sepiidae
- Genus: Spathidosepion
- Species: S. angulata

Binomial name
- Spathidosepion angulata Roeleveld, 1972

Species of cuttlefish

Spathidosepion angulata is a species of cuttlefish native to the southeastern Atlantic Ocean, from Bloubergstrand (33°48′S 18°27′E) to Still Bay (34°23′S 21°25′E). It is known only from cuttlebones. The validity of S. angulata has been questioned.

Cuttlebones of this species are up to 75 mm in length.

The type specimen was collected near Bloubergstrand, South Africa (33°48′S 18°27′E) and is deposited at the South African Museum.
