= Sepia peterseni =

Conservation status
- Data Deficient (IUCN 3.1)

Scientific classification
- Kingdom: Animalia
- Phylum: Mollusca
- Class: Cephalopoda
- Order: Sepiida
- Family: Sepiidae
- Genus: Sepia
- Subgenus: Doratosepion
- Species: S. peterseni

Binomial name
- Sepia peterseni Appellöf, 1886

Species of cuttlefish

Sepia peterseni is a species of cuttlefish native to the western Pacific Ocean. Its natural range stretches south of central Honshū to southern Kyūshū, and it is also present in South Korea. It lives on the inner shelf at depths of between 20 and 100 m.

Sepia peterseni grows to a mantle length of 120 mm. It has an elongated mantle, with a cuttlebone to match.

The type specimen was collected off Japan and is deposited at the Zoologiska Museet in Sweden.
