= Paracallionymus =

Scientific classification
- Kingdom: Animalia
- Phylum: Chordata
- Class: Actinopterygii
- Order: Syngnathiformes
- Family: Callionymidae
- Genus: Paracallionymus; Barnard, 1927
- Species: P. costatus

Binomial name
- Paracallionymus costatus (Boulenger, 1898)

Synonyms
- Callionymus costatus Boulenger, 1898; Paracallionymus fowleri Poll, 1949

Genus of fishes

Paracallionymus costatus, the ladder dragonet, is a species of dragonet found along the southern coast of Africa from Namibia to Mozambique where it occurs at depths of from 55 to 400 metres (180 to 1,312 ft). This species grows to a length of 15 centimetres (5.9 in) TL. This species is the only known member of the genus Paracallionymus.
