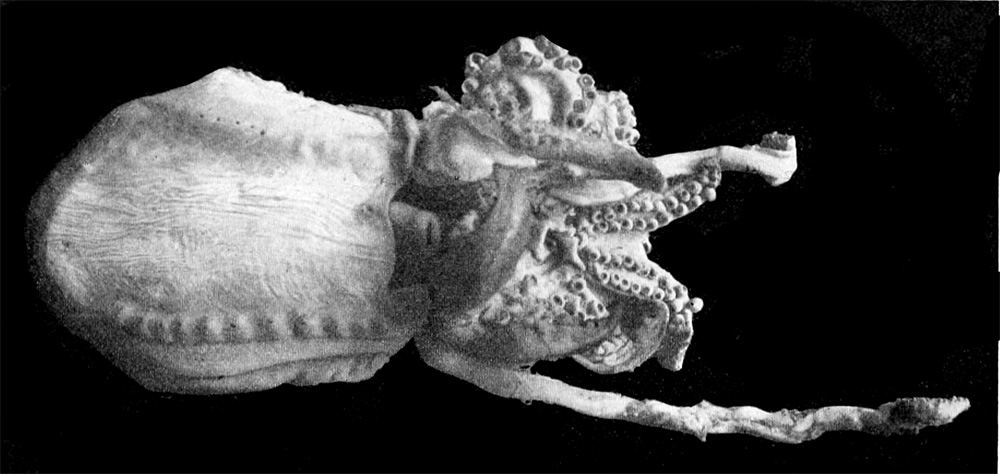

Conservation status
- Least Concern (IUCN 3.1)

Scientific classification
- Kingdom: Animalia
- Phylum: Mollusca
- Class: Cephalopoda
- Order: Sepiida
- Family: Sepiidae
- Genus: Hemisepius
- Species: H. typicus

Binomial name
- Hemisepius typicus Steenstrup, 1875

Synonyms
- Sepia typica (Steenstrup, 1875)

= Hemisepius typicus =

Species of cuttlefish

Hemisepius typicus is a species of cuttlefish native to the southwestern Indian Ocean and southeastern Atlantic Ocean. Its natural range stretches from Saldanha Bay, South Africa (33°00′S 17°56′E) to southern Mozambique. It lives at depths of 2 to 290 m.

H. typicus is a very small species, growing to only 26 mm (1.0 in) in mantle length.

The type specimen was collected in Table Bay, South Africa (33°50′S 18°27′E). It is deposited at the Kobenhavns Universitet Zoologisk Museum in Copenhagen.
