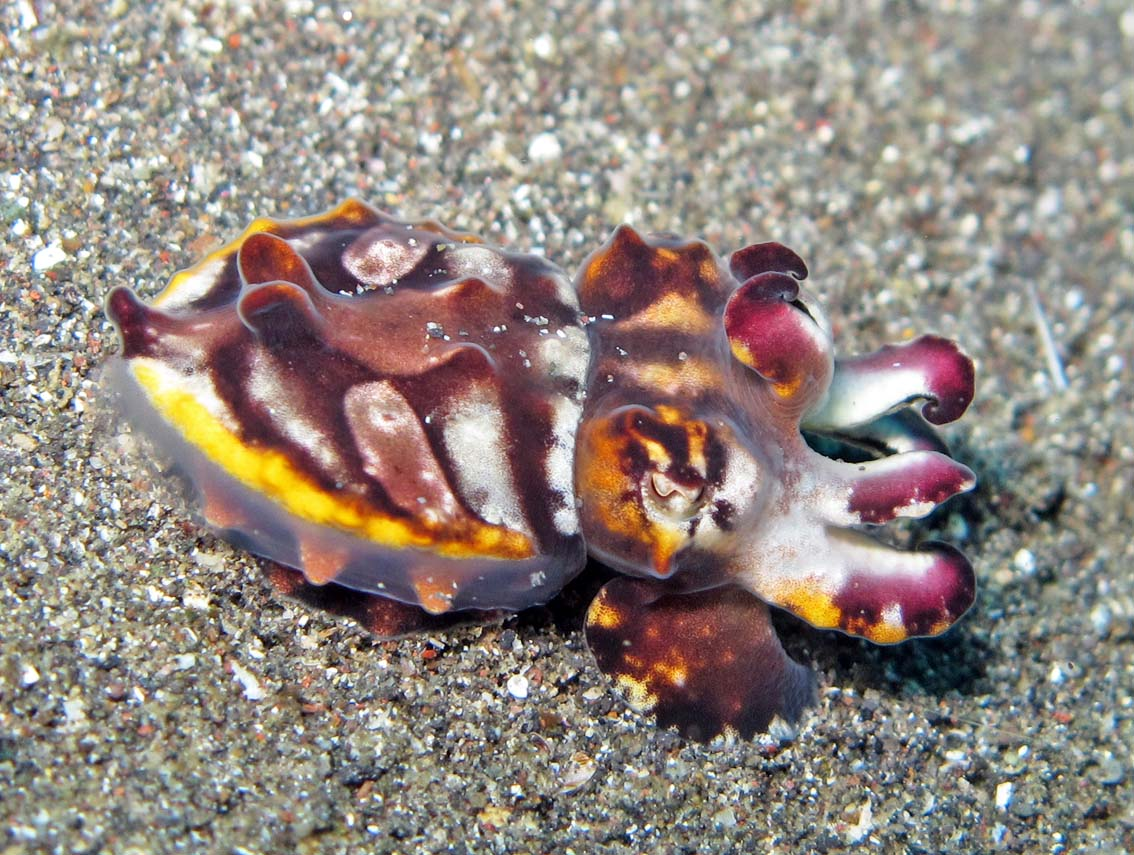
- Ascarosepion pfefferi at Lembeh Sulawesi, 2014

Conservation status
- Data Deficient (IUCN 3.1)

Scientific classification
- Kingdom: Animalia
- Phylum: Mollusca
- Class: Cephalopoda
- Order: Sepiida
- Family: Sepiidae
- Genus: Ascarosepion
- Species: A. pfefferi

Binomial name
- Ascarosepion pfefferi (Hoyle, 1885)

Synonyms
- Sepia (Metasepia) pfefferi Hoyle, 1885; Metasepia pfefferi (Hoyle, 1885)

= Ascarosepion pfefferi =

Species of cuttlefish

Ascarosepion pfefferi, also known as the flamboyant cuttlefish, is a species of cuttlefish occurring in tropical Indo-Pacific waters off northern Australia, southern New Guinea, as well as numerous islands of the Philippines, Indonesia, and Malaysia.

== Taxonomy ==
The type specimen, a female, was collected off Challenger Station 188 in the Arafura Sea (09°59′S 139°42′E) at a depth of 28 fathoms (51 m (167 ft)) on October 9, 1874, as part of the Challenger expedition. It is deposited at The Natural History Museum in London.

The flamboyant cuttlefish was moved into genus Ascarosepion in 2023; within this genus it is grouped with 13 other species, such as the broadclub cuttlefish, the reaper cuttlefish, and the giant cuttlefish. This reclassification renders the genus Metasepia obsolete.

== Description ==
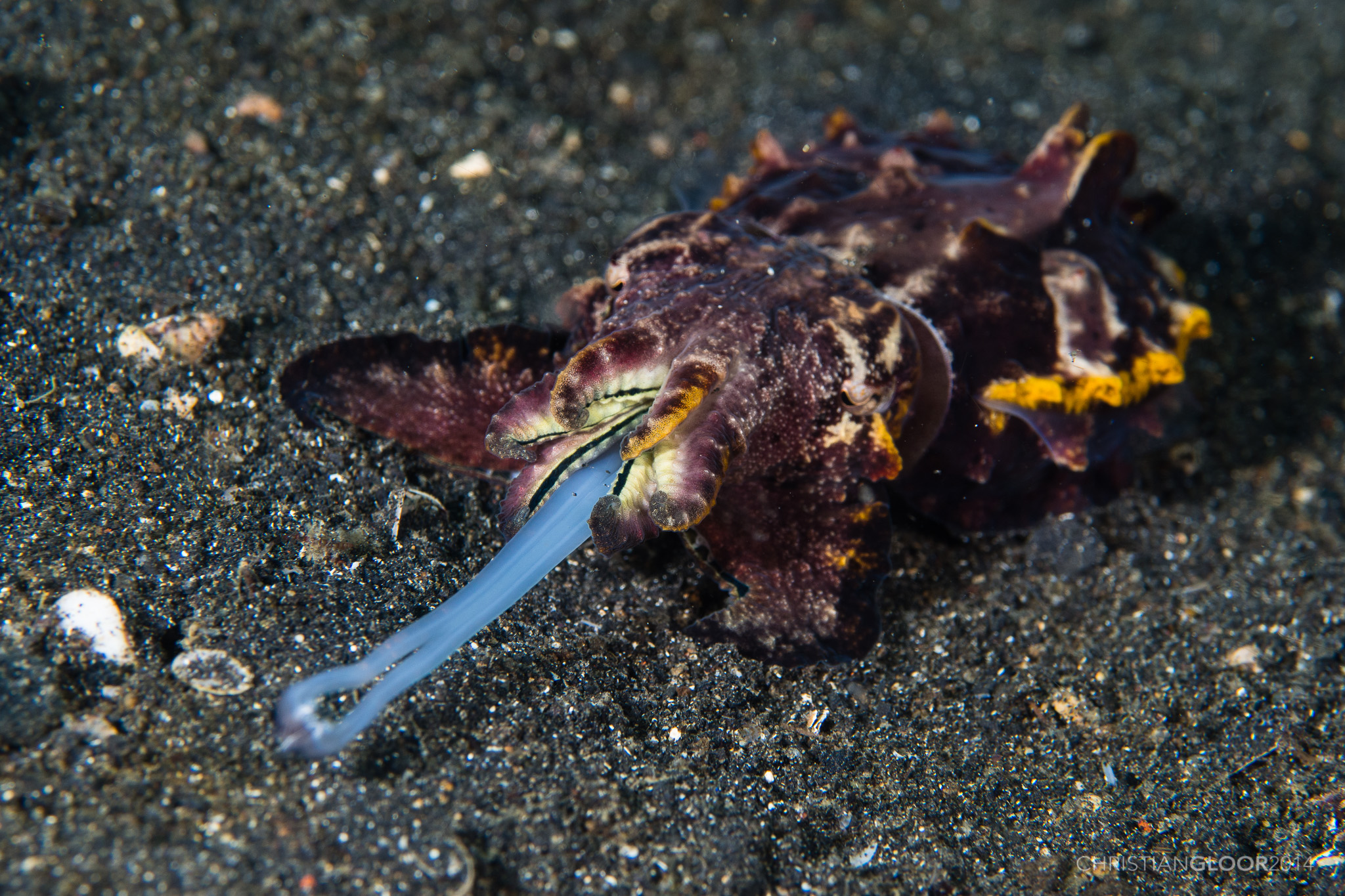
A. pfefferi with feeding tentacles extended

A. pfefferi is a robust-looking species, having a very broad, oval mantle. Arms are broad and blade-like and have four rows of suckers. The modified arm used by males for fertilisation, called the hectocotylus, is borne on the left ventral arm. The oral surface of the modified region of the hectocotylus is wide, swollen, and fleshy. It bears transversely-grooved ridges and a deep furrow running along the middle. The sucker-bearing surface of the tentacular clubs is flattened, with 5 or 6 suckers arranged in transverse rows. These suckers differ greatly in size, with the largest located near the centre of the club. Three to four median suckers are especially large, occupying most of middle portion of the club. The swimming keel of the club extends considerably near to the carpus. The dorsal and ventral protective membranes are not joined at the base of the club, but fused to the tentacular stalk. Dorsal and ventral membranes differ in length and extend near to the carpus along the stalk. The dorsal membrane forms a shallow cleft at the junction with the stalk.

The cuttlebone of this species is small, two-thirds to three-quarters the length of the mantle, and positioned in its anterior. Characteristic of the former genus Metasepia, the cuttlebone is rhomboidal in outline. Both the anterior and posterior of the cuttlebone taper gradually to an acute point. The dorsal surface of the cuttlebone is yellowish and evenly convex. The texture throughout is smooth, lacking bumps or pustules. The dorsal median rib is absent. A thin film of chitin covers the entire dorsal surface. The cuttlebone lacks a pronounced spine; if present, it is small and chitinous. The striated zone of the cuttlebone is concave, with the last loculus being strongly convex and thick in the front third. The sulcus is deep and wide and extends along the striated zone only. Striae (furrows) on the anterior surface form an inverted V-shape. The limbs of the inner cone are very short, narrow, and uniform in width, with the U-shape thickened slightly toward the back. The cuttlebone of A. pfefferi does not possess an outer cone, unlike that of most other cuttlefish species. As a result this particular genus of cuttlefish, both A. pfefferi and sister species A. tullbergi, is the only one known to "walk" upon the sea floor. Due to the small size of its cuttlebone, it can float only for a short time.

Most sources agree that A. pfefferi grows to 8 cm (3.1 in) in mantle length, although others give a maximum mantle length of 6 cm (2.4 in). The dorsal surface of the mantle bears three pairs of large, flat, flap-like papillae. Papillae are also present over the eyes.

== Distribution ==
The natural range of A. pfefferi extends from Mandurah in Western Australia (32°33′S 115°04′E), northeastward to Moreton Bay in southern Queensland (27°25′S 153°15′E), and across the Arafura Sea to the southern coast of New Guinea. The species has also been recorded from Sulawesi and the Maluku Islands in Indonesia, and even as far west as the Malaysian islands of Mabul and Sipadan. They are also common in the Philippines and are frequently sighted in the Visayas.

== Habitat and biology ==
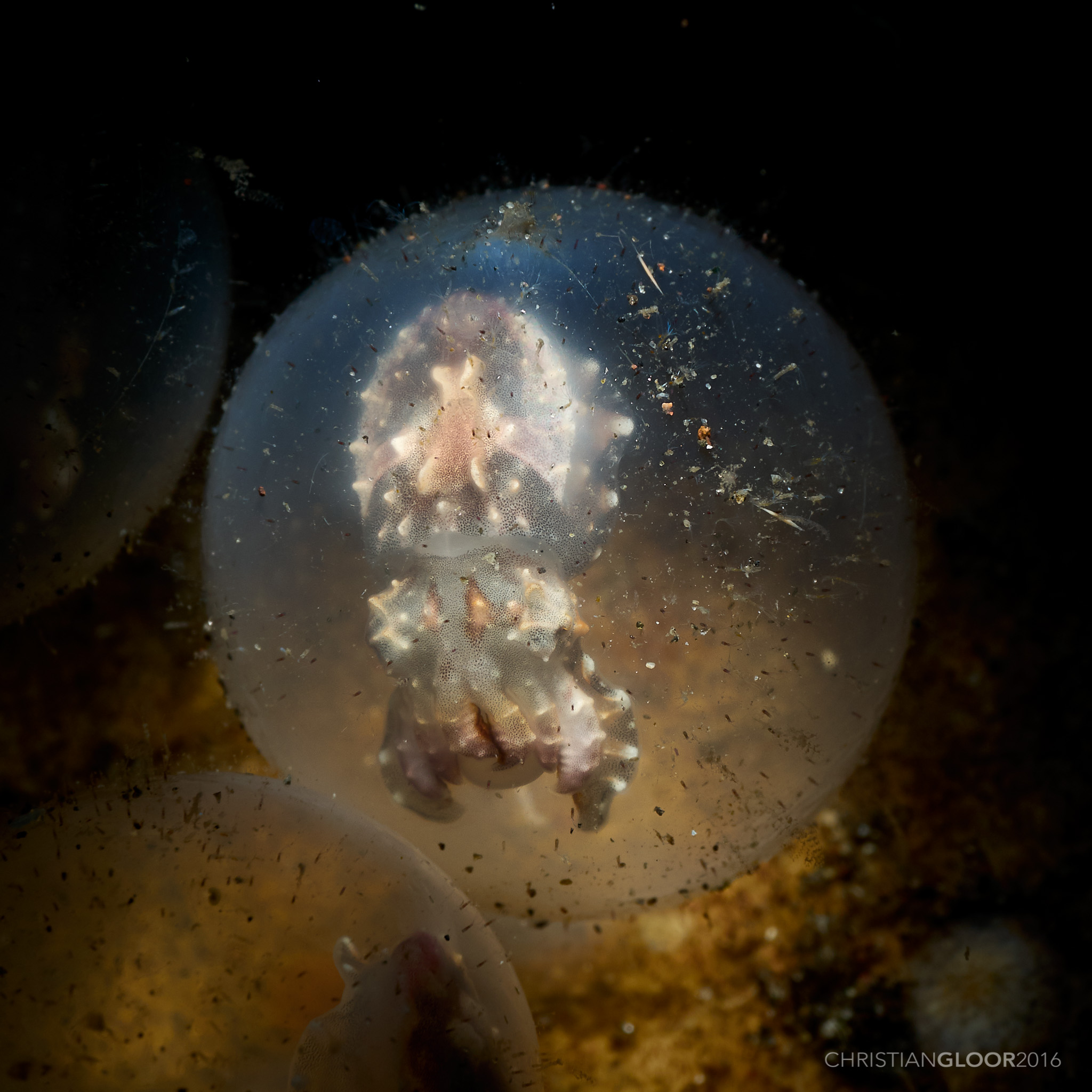
Unhatched egg, embryo clearly visible

A. pfefferi has been recorded from sand and mud substrate in shallow waters at depths of 3–86 m (9.8–282.2 ft). The species is active during the day and has been observed hunting fish and crustaceans. It employs complex and varied camouflage to stalk its prey. The normal base colour of this species is dark brown. Individuals that are disturbed or attacked quickly change colour to a pattern of black, dark brown, white, with yellow patches around the mantle, arms, and eyes. The arm-tips often display bright red colouration to ward off would-be predators. Animals displaying this colour pattern have been observed using their lower arms to walk or "amble" along the sea floor while rhythmically waving the wide protective membranes on their arms. This behavior supposedly advertises the poisonous flesh of this cuttlefish, but significant amounts of toxins have not yet been isolated from this species.

=== Reproduction ===
Copulation occurs face-to-face, with the male inserting a packet of sperm into a pouch on the underside of the female's mantle. The female then fertilises her eggs with the sperm. The eggs are laid singly and placed by the female in crevices or ledges in coral, rock, or wood. In one instance, around a dozen eggs were found under an overturned coconut husk half. They had been placed there by a female which had inserted them through the central hole of the husk. Thereby, the eggs were protected from predatory fish.

Freshly-laid eggs are white, but slowly turn translucent with time, making the developing cuttlefish clearly visible. From emergence, hatchling A. pfefferi are capable of producing the same camouflage patterns as adults; they are truly precocial and do not receive any care from their parents.

== Commercial value ==
A toxicology report has confirmed that the muscle tissue of flamboyant cuttlefish is highly-toxic, making it only the third cephalopod found to be poisonous. Research by Mark Norman with the Museum Victoria in Melbourne, Victoria, Australia, has shown the toxin to be the same as that of fellow cephalopod the blue-ringed octopus. However, preliminary results from researchers at Georgia Southern University and Utah State University-Uintah Basin found only trace amounts of tetrodotoxin in the flamboyant cuttlefish; the concentrations found were too low to be toxic to vertebrates.

A. pfefferi represents no interest to fisheries due to their potential toxicity. If its supply were steady, the spectacular color and textural displays of this species would make it an excellent candidate for private aquariums. The species is sometimes seen in public aquariums, available through captive breeding programs, such as the Monterey Bay Aquarium.

== Gallery ==
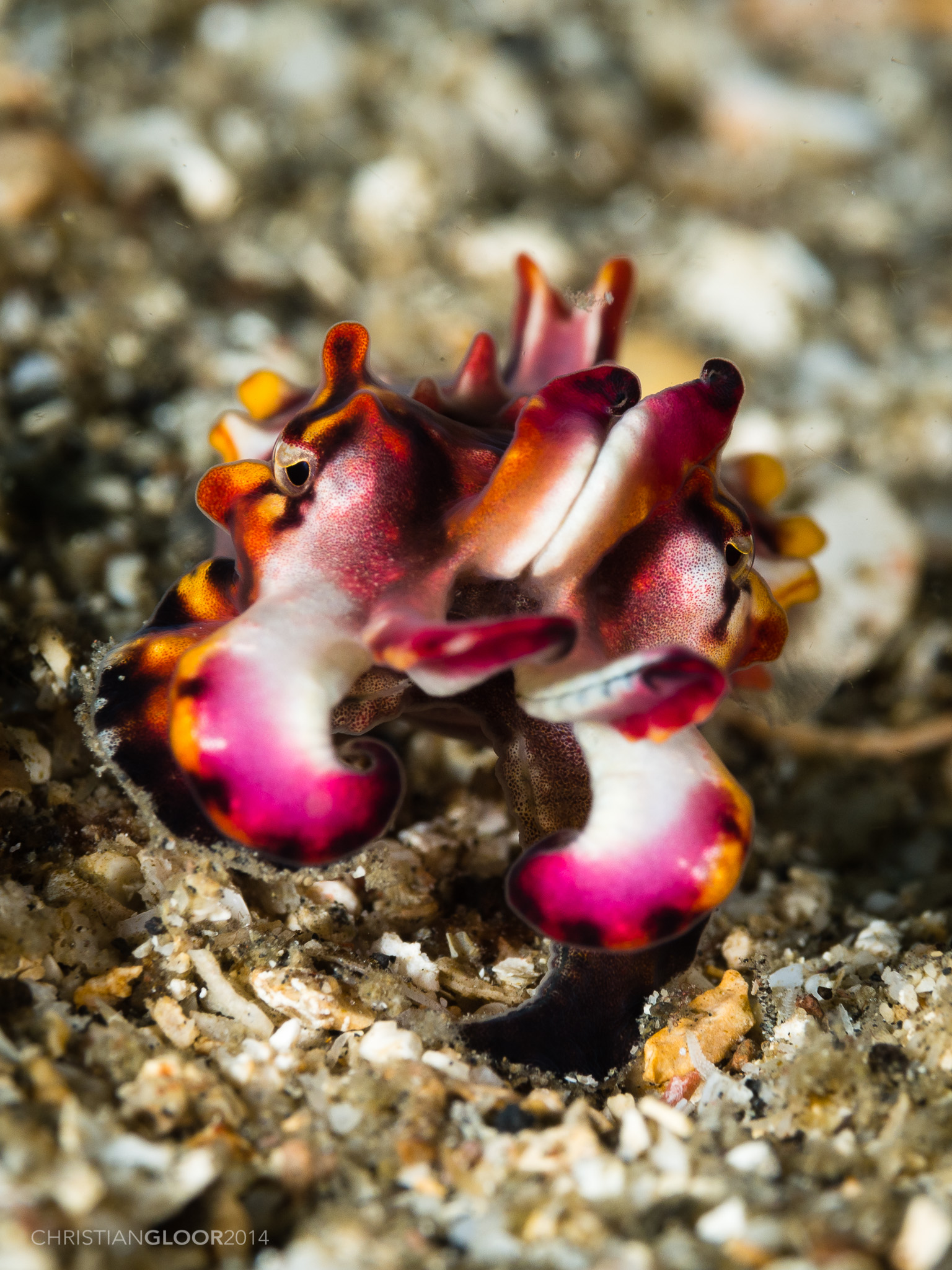
Wakatobi National Park Sulawesi, 2014

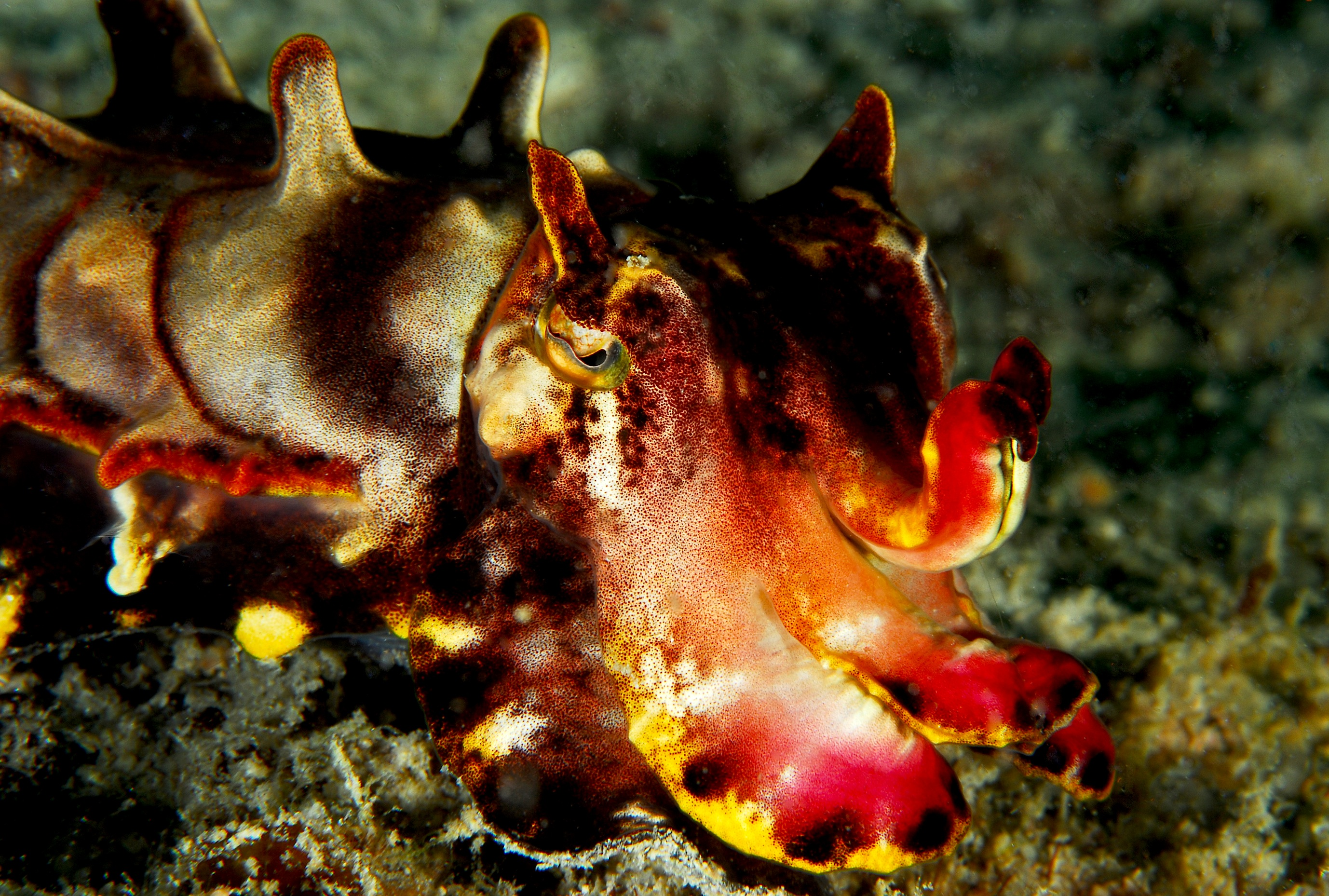
Sipadan, Malaysia

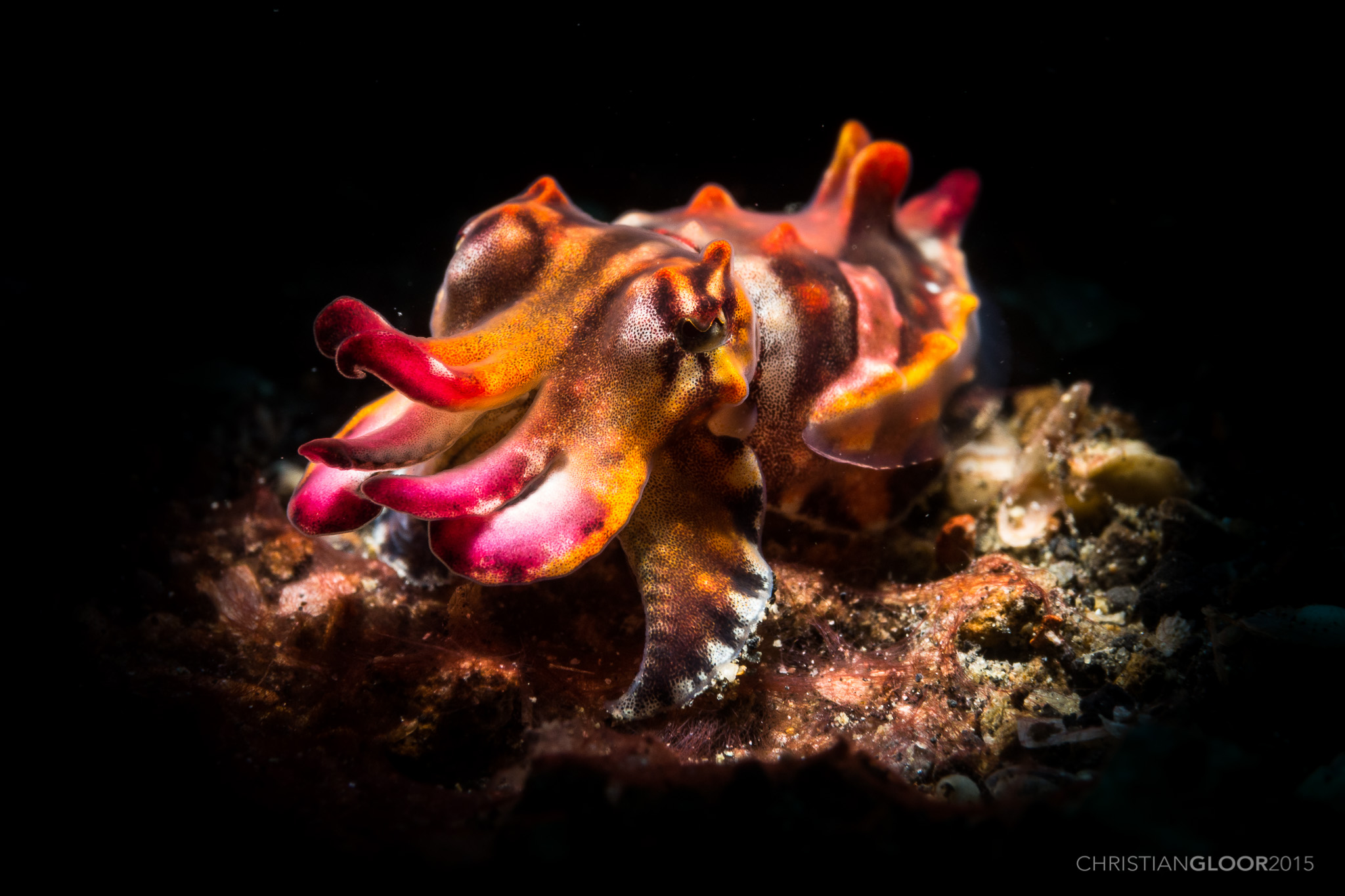
Wakatobi

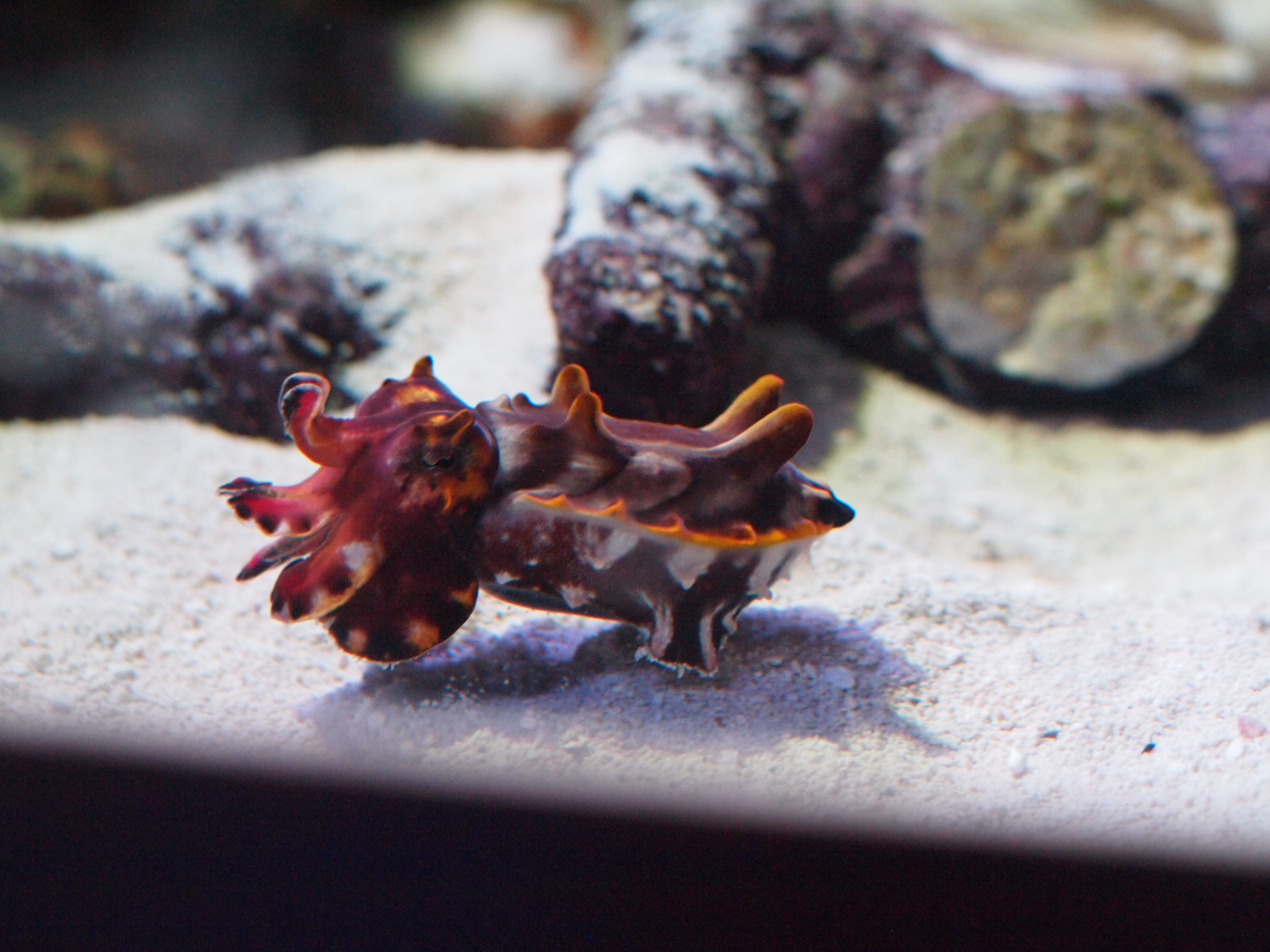
Monterey Bay Aquarium

Stalking a shrimp, Museum of Science, Miami

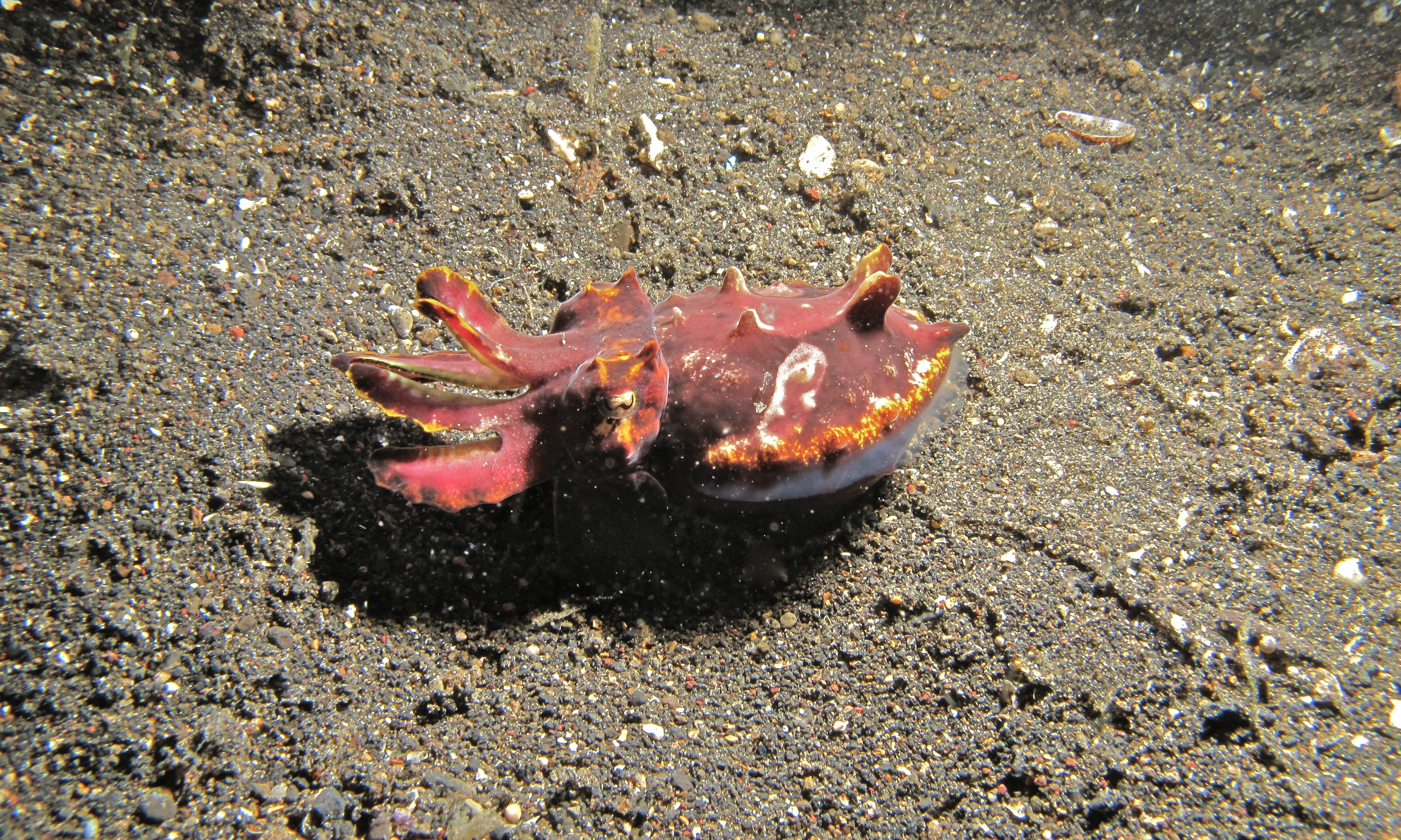
Lembeh Strait

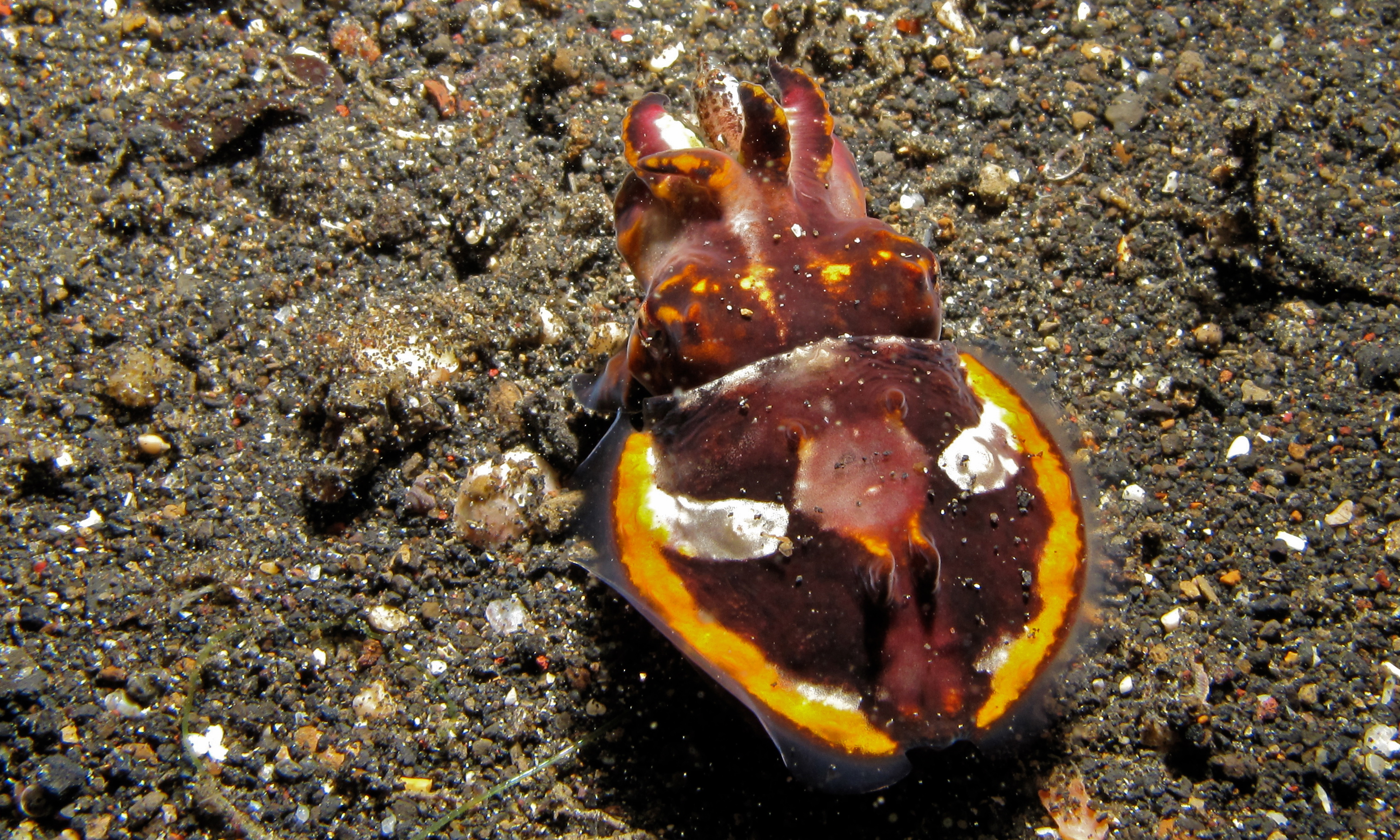
Eating a sandperch (Parapercis lineopunctata), Lembeh

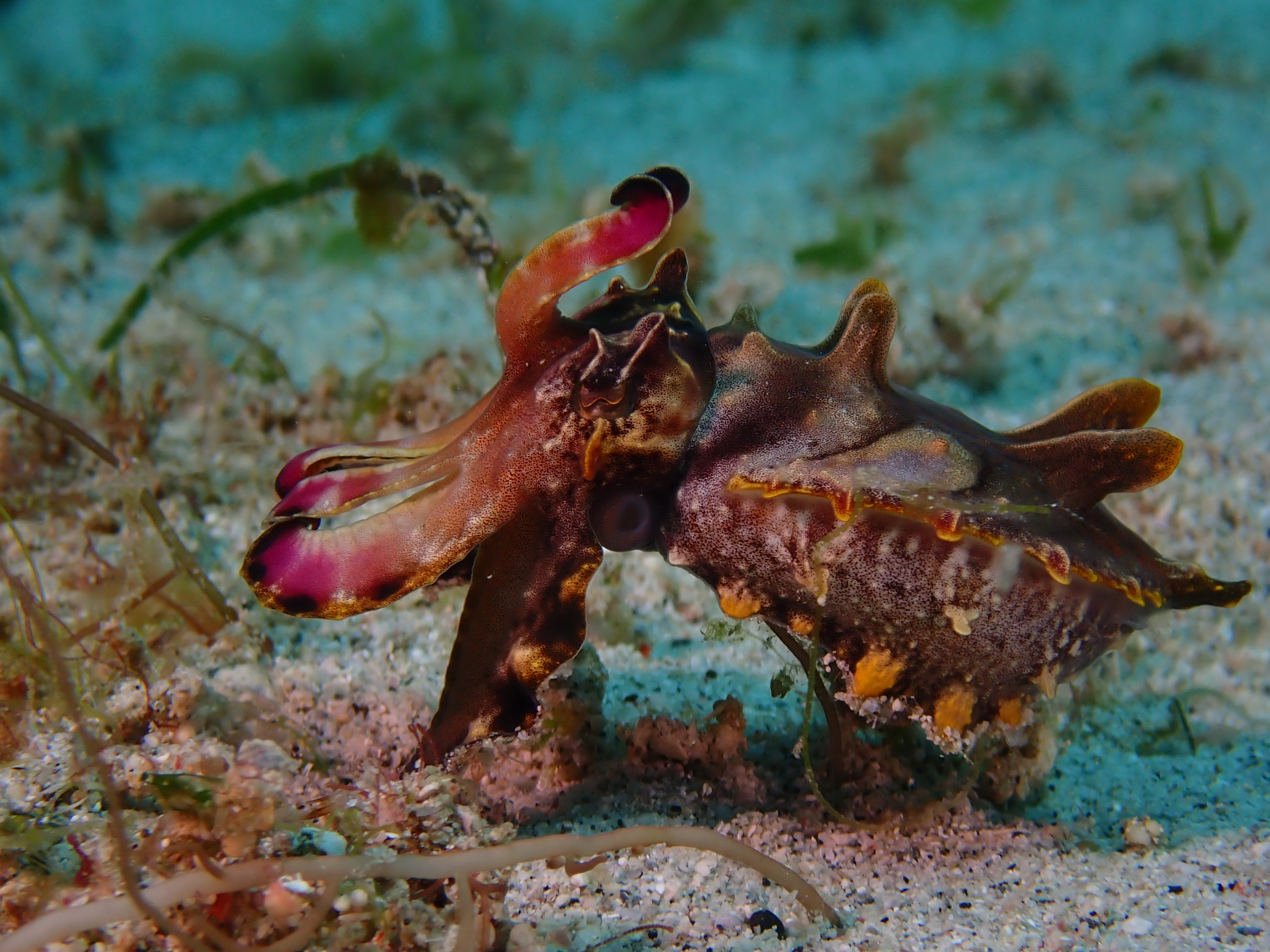
Apo Reef
