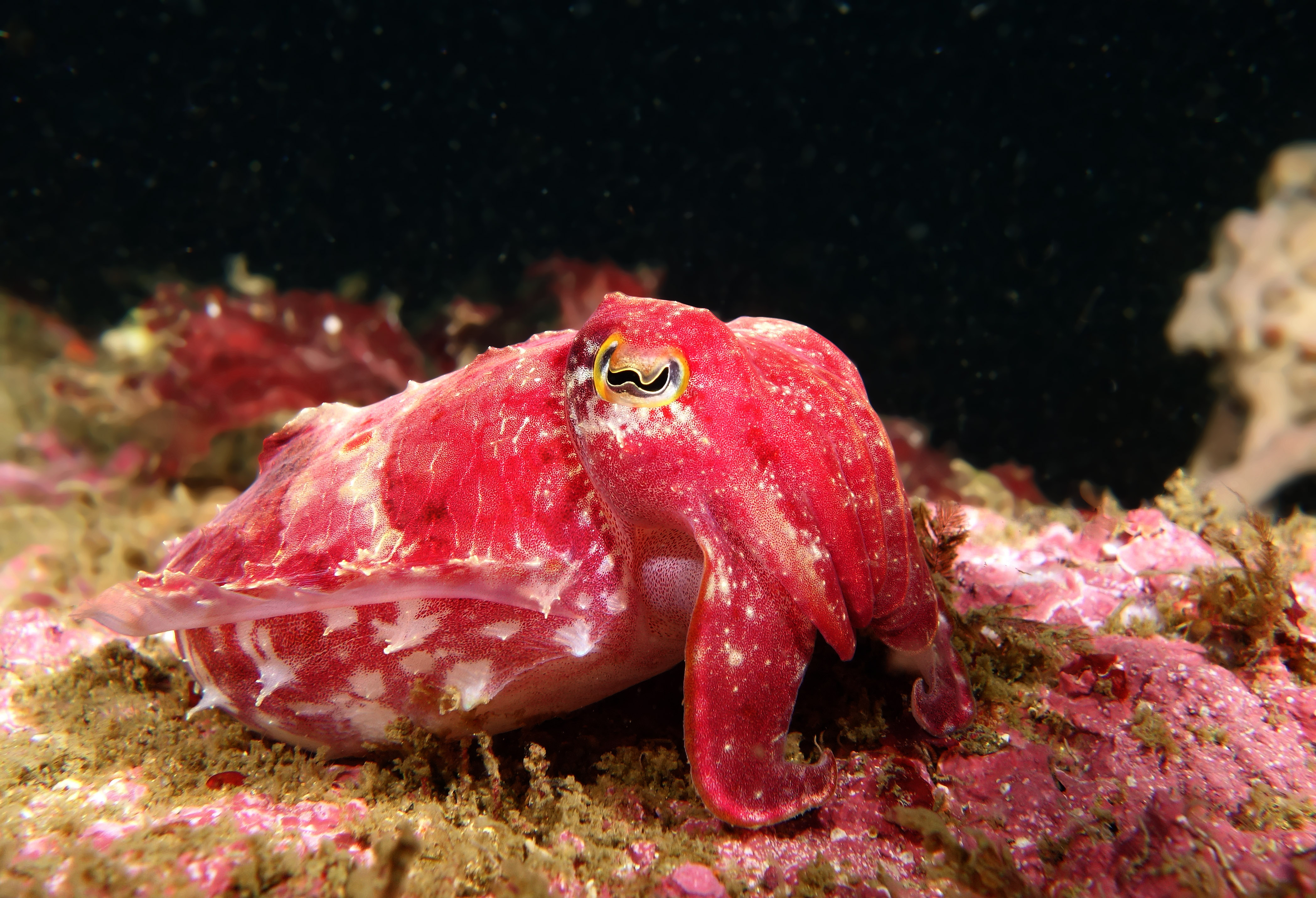
- Ascarosepion mestus
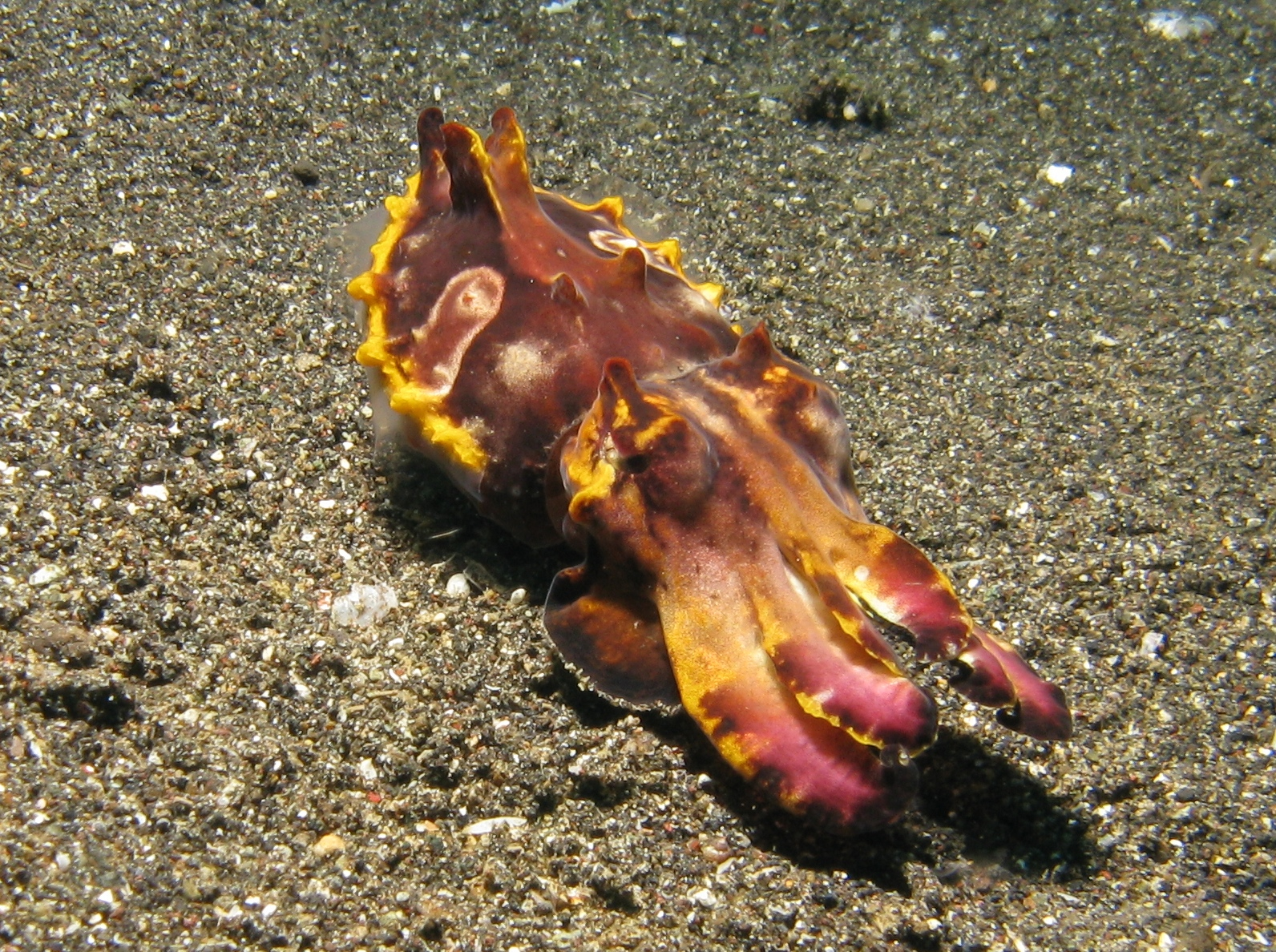
- Ascarosepion pfefferi

Scientific classification
- Kingdom: Animalia
- Phylum: Mollusca
- Class: Cephalopoda
- Order: Sepiida
- Family: Sepiidae
- Genus: Ascarosepion; Hoyle, 1885

Type species
- Ascarosepion verreauxi Rochebrune, 1884

Species
- see text

Synonyms
- List: Sepia (Metasepia) Hoyle, 1885; Metasepia Hoyle, 1885; Amplisepia Iredale, 1926; Glyptosepia Iredale, 1926; Mesembrisepia Iredale, 1926; Ponderisepia Iredale, 1926; Solitosepia Iredale, 1926

= Ascarosepion =

Genus of cuttlefishes

Ascarosepion is a genus of cuttlefish inhabiting the coastal regions of the Indian Ocean and East Pacific (comprising part of the Indo-Pacific region). The genus varies wildly in size, from the two species of small, colorful cuttlefish formerly classified in the genus Metasepia, to the largest species of extant cuttlefish, the giant cuttlefish.

== Taxonomy ==
Ascarosepion was described in 1884 by French malacologist Alphonse Trémeau de Rochebrune in 1884. He diagnosed it as possessing an "ovoid body, with narrow fins. Arms very short but robust which end abruptly in pointed tips. Suckers of varied size set on 3-4 rows. Buccal membrane narrow and wrinkled. The thin, elliptical cuttlebone resembles to a sandal in shape, with a rugose and convex dorsal surface and very flat bottom; two enormous calcareous "wings", acuminated at the front and very wide at the rear." (transl.) The name is derived from a combination of the Greek words askaros (ἄσκαρος, translated by Rochebrune as slipper (babouche)) and sepion; the type species, A. verreauxi, was collected off Sydney, and the holotype stored in "Mus. Paris", presumably the Natural History Museum. Subsequent authors treated Ascarosepion as a synonym of Sepia for over a century.

Metasepia was described from a type specimen collected in the Arafura Sea (09°59′S 139°42′E) at a depth of 28 fathoms (51 m (167 ft)) on October 9 1874, as part of the Challenger expedition. It is deposited at The Natural History Museum in London. The name is presumably derived from a combination of meta- and sepia.

A 2023 paper revived several genera of cuttlefish and elevated some subgenera of Sepia to full genus level based on molecular sequencing; this study recovered Ascarosepion as a distinct clade of cuttlefish with the two species previously within Metasepia nested within its lineage. Genus Ascarosepion was determined to range from the coast of Tasmania and South Africa up to the Persian Gulf and the Red and Yellow Seas. This classification scheme has been accepted by various databases, such as WoRMS, SeaLifeBase, GBIF, and iNaturalist.

== Species ==
Phylogeny

- Ascarosepion
  - - A. opipara
    - A. cultrata
  - - A. latimanus
    - - - A. bandensis
        - - A. apama
          - A. novaehollandiae
      - - ″Metasepia″
          - A. pfefferi
          - A. tullbergi
        - - - A. mestus
            - A. rozella
          - - A. papuensis
            - A. plangon

WoRMS accepts the following species:

- Ascarosepion apama (J. E. Gray, 1849); Giant cuttlefish
- Ascarosepion bandense (Adam, 1939); Dwarf cuttlefish
- Ascarosepion cultratum (Hoyle, 1885)
- Ascarosepion filibrachia (A. Reid & Lu, 2005)
- Ascarosepion latimanus (Quoy & Gaimard, 1832); Broadclub cuttlefish
- Ascarosepion mestus (J. E. Gray, 1849); Reaper cuttlefish
- Ascarosepion novaehollandiae (Hoyle, 1909)
- Ascarosepion opiparum (Iredale, 1926)
- Ascarosepion papuense (Hoyle, 1885); Papuan cuttlefish
- Ascarosepion pfefferi (Hoyle, 1885); Flamboyant cuttlefish
- Ascarosepion plangon (J. E. Gray, 1849)
- Ascarosepion rozella (Iredale, 1926)
- Ascarosepion tullbergi (Appellöf, 1886); Paintpot cuttlefish
