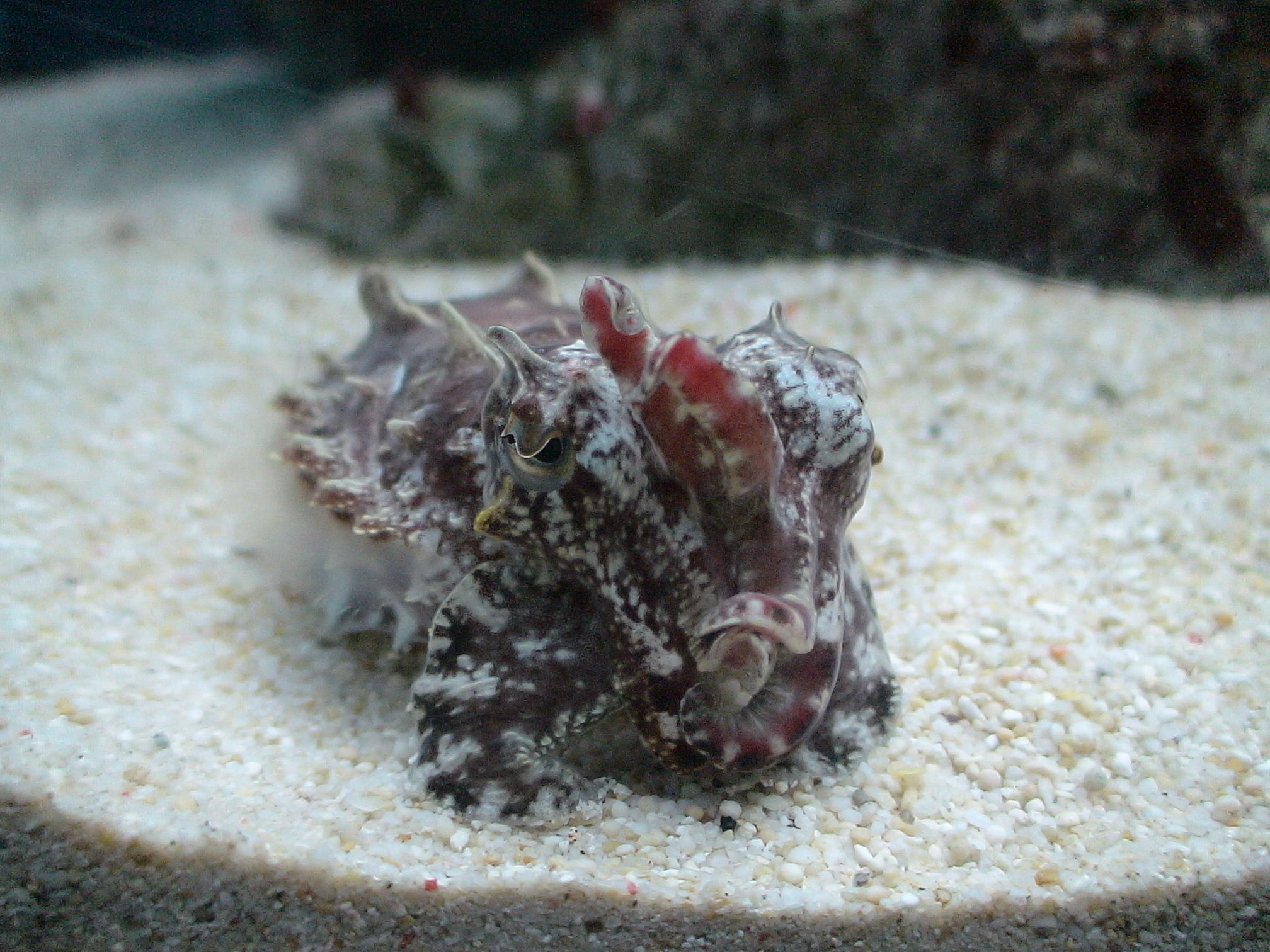

Conservation status
- Data Deficient (IUCN 3.1)

Scientific classification
- Kingdom: Animalia
- Phylum: Mollusca
- Class: Cephalopoda
- Order: Sepiida
- Family: Sepiidae
- Genus: Ascarosepion
- Species: A. tullbergi

Binomial name
- Ascarosepion tullbergi (Appellöf, 1886)

Synonyms
- Sepia tullbergi Appellöf, 1886; Metasepia tullbergi (Appellöf, 1886)

= Ascarosepion tullbergi =

Species of cuttlefish

Ascarosepion tullbergi, the paintpot cuttlefish, is a small, poorly researched species of cuttlefish found in the Indo-Pacific, between Japan and Hong Kong. It was one of the two species classified in the genus Metasepia, which was lumped into Ascarosepion in 2023. Metasepia cuttlefish are characterized by their small, thick, diamond-shaped cuttlebone, and distinctive body coloration.

== Description ==
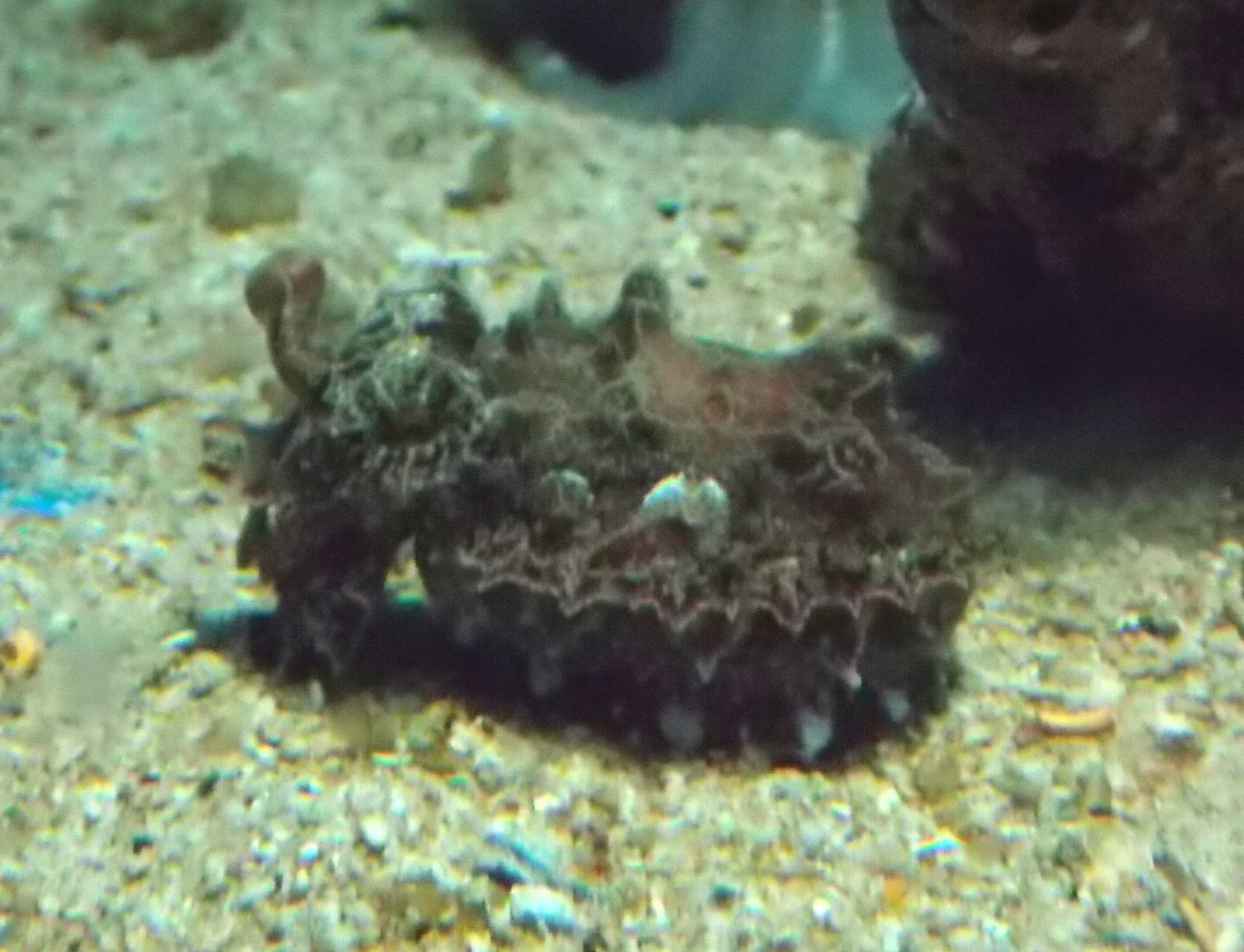
Northern Flamboyant Cuttlefish (Ascarosepion tullbergi)

Paintpot cuttlefish are a slow-moving, bottom-dwelling species. Their mantle (the "body") is about 70 mm (2.8 in) long; it has a broad, oval-shape with 10 to 13 pores on each side. Their fins are joined in the back of the animal with arms located on the opposite end of the squid at the head, like all coleoids. Their arms typically have 10 to 12 rows of shorter suckers followed by larger ones and then tapering in size through to the arm tip. Their adult weight ranges from 30 to 40 g (1.1 to 1.4 oz). The hectocolytus (male sperm) is present in the left ventral arm. Unlike other species of cuttlefish, former Metasepia have a cuttlebone that is much smaller than their mantle. Characteristic of cephalopods, chitin is present as a thin film covering the entire dorsal surface of the cuttlebone and tapers into a sharp point on the dorsal corner. The anterior surface of the cuttlebone is entirely covered in chitin; the posterior surface is calcareous. The paintpot cuttlefish's chromatophores are mostly set to be darkly colored with bright yellow spots on the head, dorsal side of mantle, and arms. The protective membranes on the arms are red.

== Habitat ==
The paintpot cuttlefish is typically found in the neritic zone of the subtropical Indo-Pacific, in the seas surrounding Japan, China and Korea. Sightings have been recorded in Japan from southern Honshu, the Sea of Japan, Yellow Sea, East China Sea to Taiwan and Hong Kong, South China Sea, the Philippines and the Gulf of Thailand. In these regions, the paintpot cuttlefish is found in the continental shelf between 20 and 100 m (66 and 328 ft) deep on sandy to muddy substrate or on sea pens in rocky substrate. It is unknown if it is sympatric with its congener the flamboyant cuttlefish.

== Life history ==
Like its sister species, the paintpot cuttlefish lives directly on the benthos; its buoyancy regulating organ, the cuttlebone, is too small to efficiently lift it off the seabed; thus it walks on its tentacles and protrusions of its mantle. Like all members of class Cephalopoda, paintpot cuttlefish are gonochoric. Each individual is either male or female. Male individuals have sperm stored in the hectocotylus, a modified arm organ that specialized to store and transfer spermatophores to a female. Males perform various displays to attract a female for copulation during which they insert their hectocotylus into a female's mantle cavity and fertilize the eggs. Egg masses are laid in rocky areas at around 20 meters deep and hatch during the summer. Freshly hatched cuttlefish, which resemble miniature adults, migrate to 80 meters depth in sandy-mud areas from August to September to grow and develop, after which the mature squid moves towards the shallows to spawn. This migration occurs in March. Embryos hatch and live as plankton in the water column for several weeks before becoming benthic adults.

== Research ==
The paintpot cuttlefish was used as a research specimen to analyze how neuronal activity may propagate through the body. One phenomenon that many cephalopods share is the ability for their skin to change colors due to the presence of chromatophores on their skin. The change of color is activated by an action potential traveling through the cephalopod skin. Because all neural activity in biological systems are controlled by the propagation of action potentials, neuroscientists are especially interested in this visual representation of action potential propagation. Cuttlefish have a mode of color change typified by dark bands traveling across the animal's body in a coordinated pattern called "passing clouds". The paintpot cuttlefish is especially conducive to this kind of research due to their small size, slow speed and the frequency of the passing clouds display. The results of this study concluded that the passing clouds phenomenon was a result of central wave generation indicating that the action potential originated at a single point controller. This may indicate that cephalopods may have a central nervous system similar to humans which can lead to larger implications in neuroscience.
