= Ascarosepion cultratum =

Conservation status
- Least Concern (IUCN 3.1)

Scientific classification
- Kingdom: Animalia
- Phylum: Mollusca
- Class: Cephalopoda
- Order: Sepiida
- Family: Sepiidae
- Genus: Ascarosepion
- Species: A. cultratum

Binomial name
- Ascarosepion cultratum Hoyle, 1885

Species of cuttlefish

Ascarosepion cultratum, commonly known as the knifebone cuttlefish or elongated cuttlefish, is a species of cuttlefish from the family Sepiidae endemic to the southern Indo-Pacific. It is a deepwater species found in subtropical and temperate Australian waters.

== Naming ==
The type specimen was collected in Twofold Bay, New South Wales and was described by William Evans Hoyle in 1885.

Ascarosepion cultratum has a pale buff pinkish brown colour. It has a crescent-shaped club with a flattened sucker bearing 5 or 6 small suckers in transverse rows. The cuttlebone is an elongate oval shape with triangular pointed anterior and narrow posterior ends. It has a salmon-coloured dorsal surface with ribbing: the median rib is distinct and narrow, flanked by two faint lateral ribs. Its mantle grows to a maximum size of 12 cm.

== Distribution ==
Its Australian distribution includes waters of Queensland, New South Wales, Victoria, Tasmania, South Australia and Western Australia.

== Habitat and ecology ==
The knifebone cuttlefish typically inhabits waters between 300 and 500 m deep. The species' known depth range extends from 132 to 803 m.
