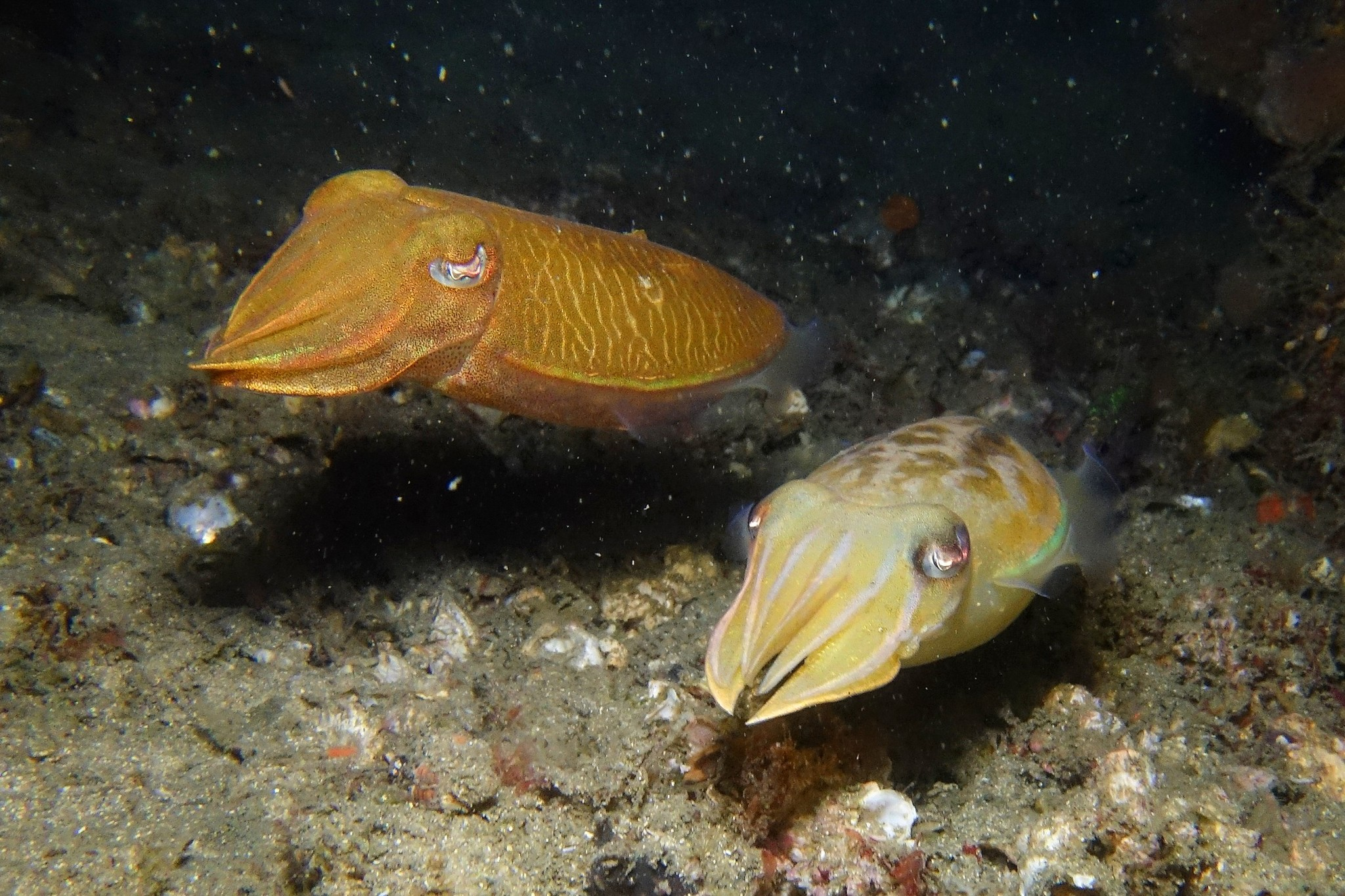

Conservation status
- Least Concern (IUCN 3.1)

Scientific classification
- Kingdom: Animalia
- Phylum: Mollusca
- Class: Cephalopoda
- Order: Sepiida
- Family: Sepiidae
- Genus: Ascarosepion
- Species: A. plangon

Binomial name
- Ascarosepion plangon (J. E. Gray, 1849)

= Ascarosepion plangon =

Species of cuttlefish

Ascarosepion plangon, the mourning cuttlefish, is a species of cuttlefish found along the east coast of Australia.

== Classification ==
Ascarosepion plangon was first scientifically described under the name Sepia plangon by J. E. Gray in 1849.

== Distribution ==
Mourning cuttlefish are found along the eastern coast of Australia in the states of Queensland, New South Wales, and Victoria, and are common in Sydney Harbour, especially in Chowder Bay. It is one of only three cuttlefish species that live in Sydney, the others being the giant cuttlefish and the reaper cuttlefish.
