= Ascarosepion latimanus =

Broadclub cuttlefish
- S. latimanus from Sipadan, Malaysia

Conservation status
- Data Deficient (IUCN 3.1)

Scientific classification
- Kingdom: Animalia
- Phylum: Mollusca
- Class: Cephalopoda
- Order: Sepiida
- Family: Sepiidae
- Genus: Ascarosepion
- Species: A. latimanus

Binomial name
- Ascarosepion latimanus (Quoy & Gaimard, 1832)

Synonyms
- Sepia latimanus Quoy & Gaimard, 1832; Sepia rappiana Férussac, 1835; Sepia mozambica Rochebrune, 1884; Sepia hercules Pilsbry, 1894; Ponderisepia eclogaria Iredale, 1926; Sepia harmeri Robson, 1928

Species of cephalopods known as the broadclub cuttlefish

Ascarosepion latimanus, also known as the broadclub cuttlefish, is widely distributed from the Andaman Sea, east to Fiji, and south to northern Australia. It is the most common cuttlefish species on coral reefs, living at a depth of up to 30 m.

== Naming and taxonomy ==
The type specimen of Ascarosepion latimanus was collected in New Guinea and is deposited at the Muséum National d'Histoire Naturelle in Paris. This species has a wide geographic range and it is probable that it represents a species complex rather than a single species but more taxonomic work needs to be carried out to assess its species limits.

The species was moved into genus Ascarosepion in 2023; within this genus it is grouped with 13 other species, such as the Metasepia cuttlefish, the reaper cuttlefish, and the giant cuttlefish.

== Description ==
The broadclub cuttlefish is the second largest cuttlefish species after the giant cuttlefish, growing to 50 cm (20 in) in mantle length and 10 kg (22 lb) in weight. Like many cephalopods, the broadclub can be seen displaying a range of colors and textures. Commonly they are light brown or yellowish with white mottled markings. Males are sometimes dark brown, particularly during courtship and mating. The arms have longitudinal white bands that appear as broad white blotches when extended. Some arms have longitudinal brown bands that extend to the head. The dorsal mantle can sometimes be seen with a saddle mark with small white and brown spots. The dorsal mantle also has narrow brown transverse bands, and bold, white, transverse stripes and spots. The eyes are yellow around the ventral margins and the fins are pale with white, transverse stripes extending onto mantle and narrow, white bands along outer margins.

== Distribution ==
Ascarosepion latimanus has a wide distribution in the Indo-Pacific region from the coasts of eastern Africa in the west following the continental coastline through southern Asia to southern Japan and as far south as northern Australia and the Coral Sea. Records from southern Australia and Madagascar are thought to be most likely misidentifications.

== Habitat and biology ==
A. latimanus is a coastal species occurring in coral reefs and which is found in shallow water to depths of 30 m (98 ft). In the western Pacific, off Guam and off Okinawa in the shallows from January to May, and the resultant eggs hatch in 38 to 40 days. It is diurnal species which appears to mesmerise its prey by using a display consisting of a series of rhythmic colour bands running along its body. It preys on fishes and crustaceans and it is known to prey on shrimp and prawns of the genus Palaemon. Breeding males are territorial and defend a coral head, typically Porites, the females lay eggs following mating in the territory of the male. Their courtship is highly ritualized and stereotyped, and like their hunting behaviour it includes striking visual displays. The males frequently guard the females, defending them from other males. The male and female mate head-to-head, the male placing the spermatophores in the buccal membrane of the female below to the mouth. After laying the eggs harden and are very hard to remove from the coral on which the female laid them. After hatching the young cuttlefish start to hide among the coral and the associated coral rubble where they often mimic mangrove leaves, their coloration and posture impersonating the leaf structure with a stem, ribs and a scattering of black spots.

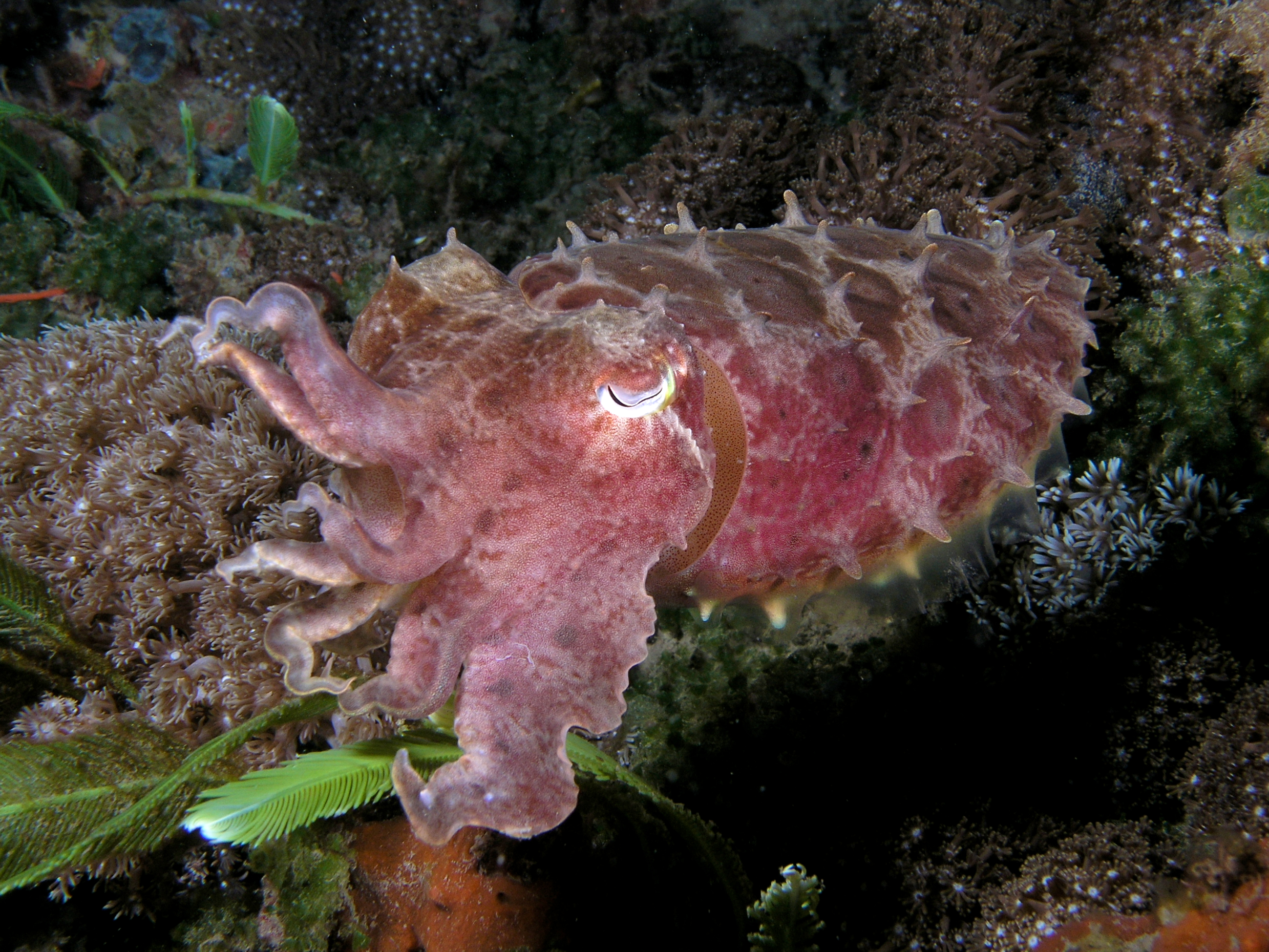
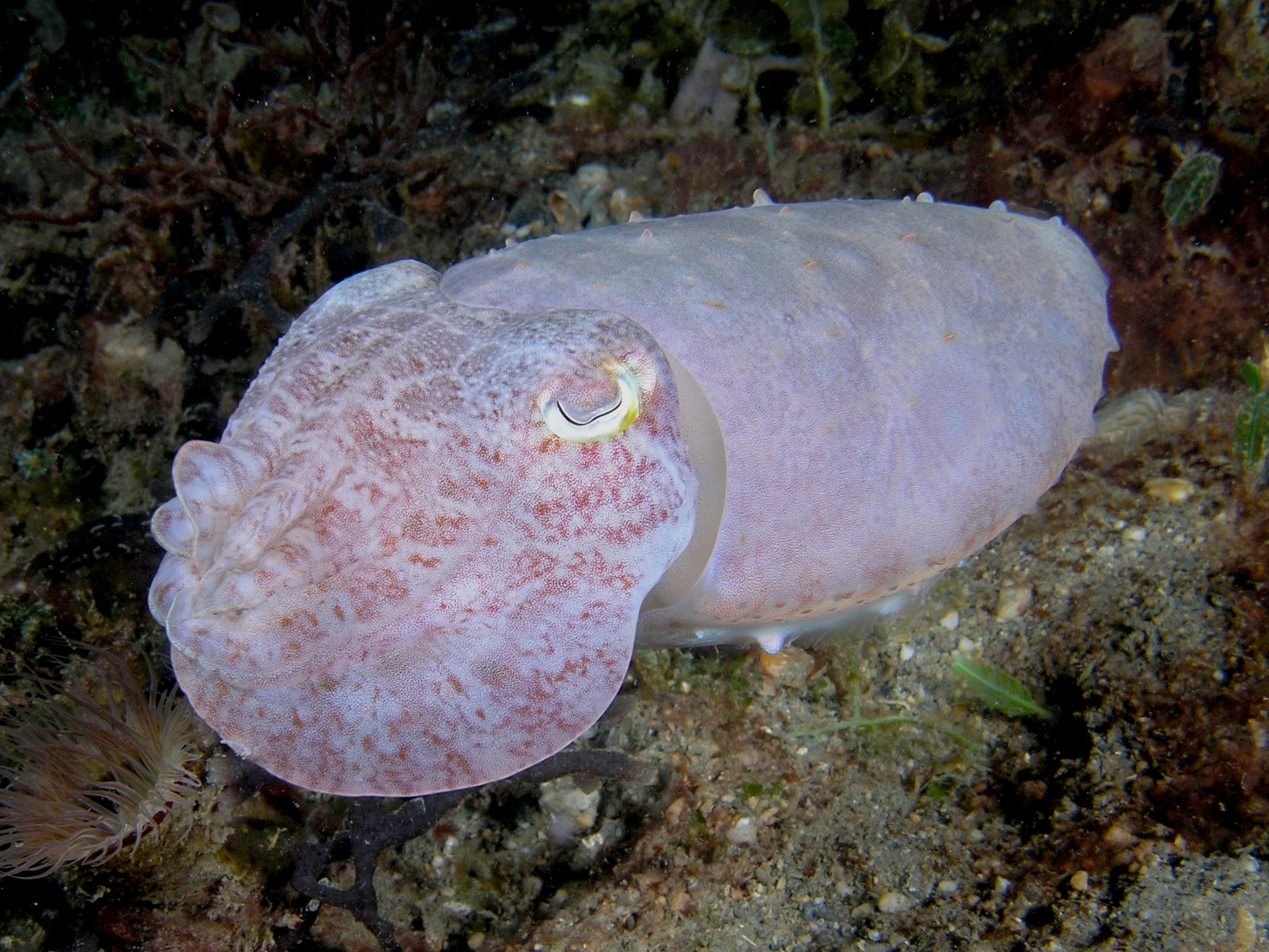
Ascarosepion latimanus colour change. These images were taken only seconds apart.

== Motion camouflage ==
Head-on view of broadback cuttlefish in motion camouflage hunting pose. The predator creates a "passing-stripe" pattern on its front, with two of its arms outstretched, reducing its appearance of looming larger as it approaches its crab prey.

Broadback cuttlefish hunt prey such as shore crabs, Carcinus maenas, by swimming directly towards them, making a "passing-stripe" display on their front. The cuttlefish colours its head white and forms six out of eight of its arms into a forward-pointing cone. The other two arms are stretched out sideways, their broad sides facing the prey. The display consists of moving dark stripes downwards over the forward-facing parts of the head and arms. The crab sees the image of the predator looming larger as it approaches; on its own, this elicits a strong reaction from the crab. Crabs presented with a combination of looming with a passing-stripe display react less strongly. The cuttlefish's posture helps to mask movements of its mantle (behind the outstretched arms), perhaps further reducing motion cues to the crab. If the crab is using radial motion from looming to detect attack, then the passing-stripe display and the body posture work together as motion camouflage, deceiving the prey by reducing that cue. Instead, the cuttlefish offers a wide horizontal body shape with vertical stripe movements.

== See also ==
- Cephalopod size
