= William Evans Hoyle =

British zoologist (1855–1926)

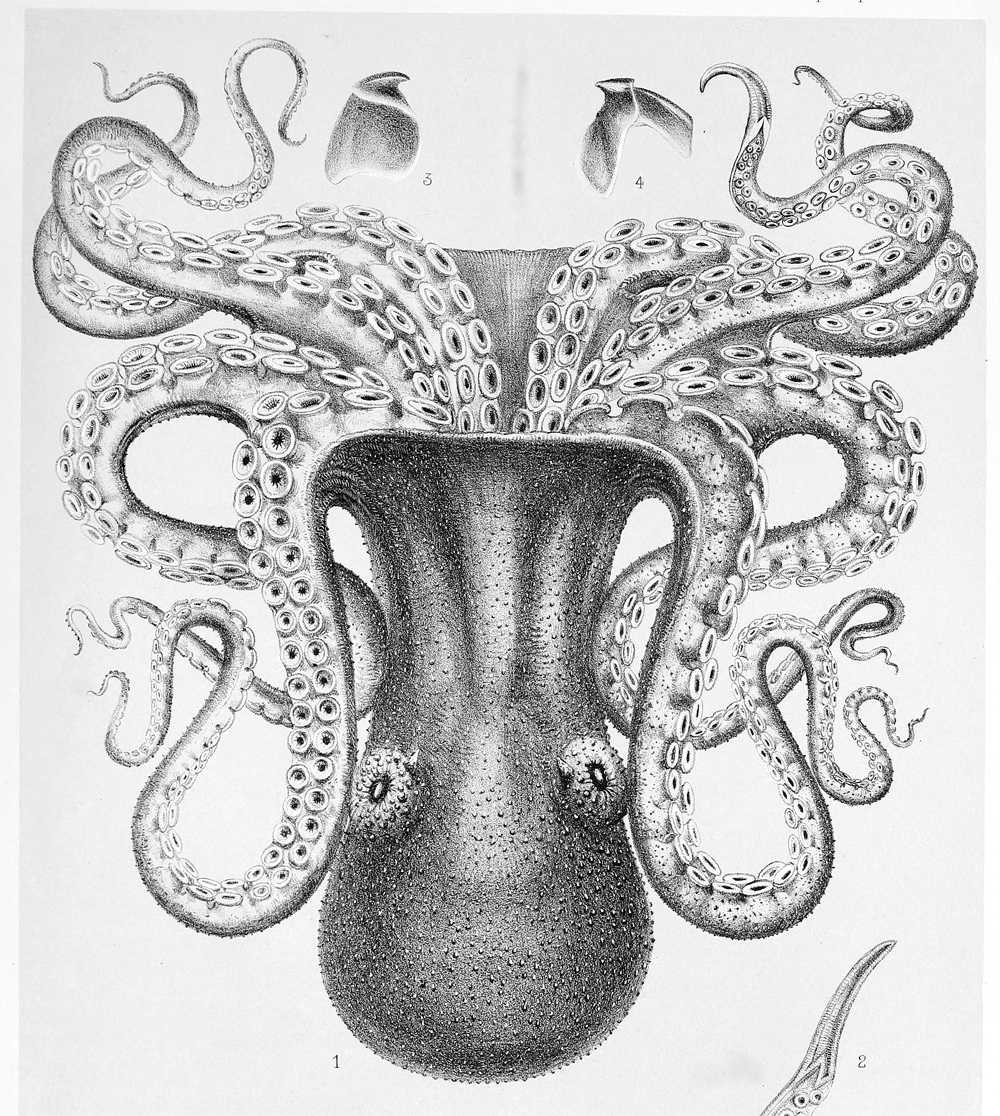
Enteroctopus dofleini, drawn by Hoyle

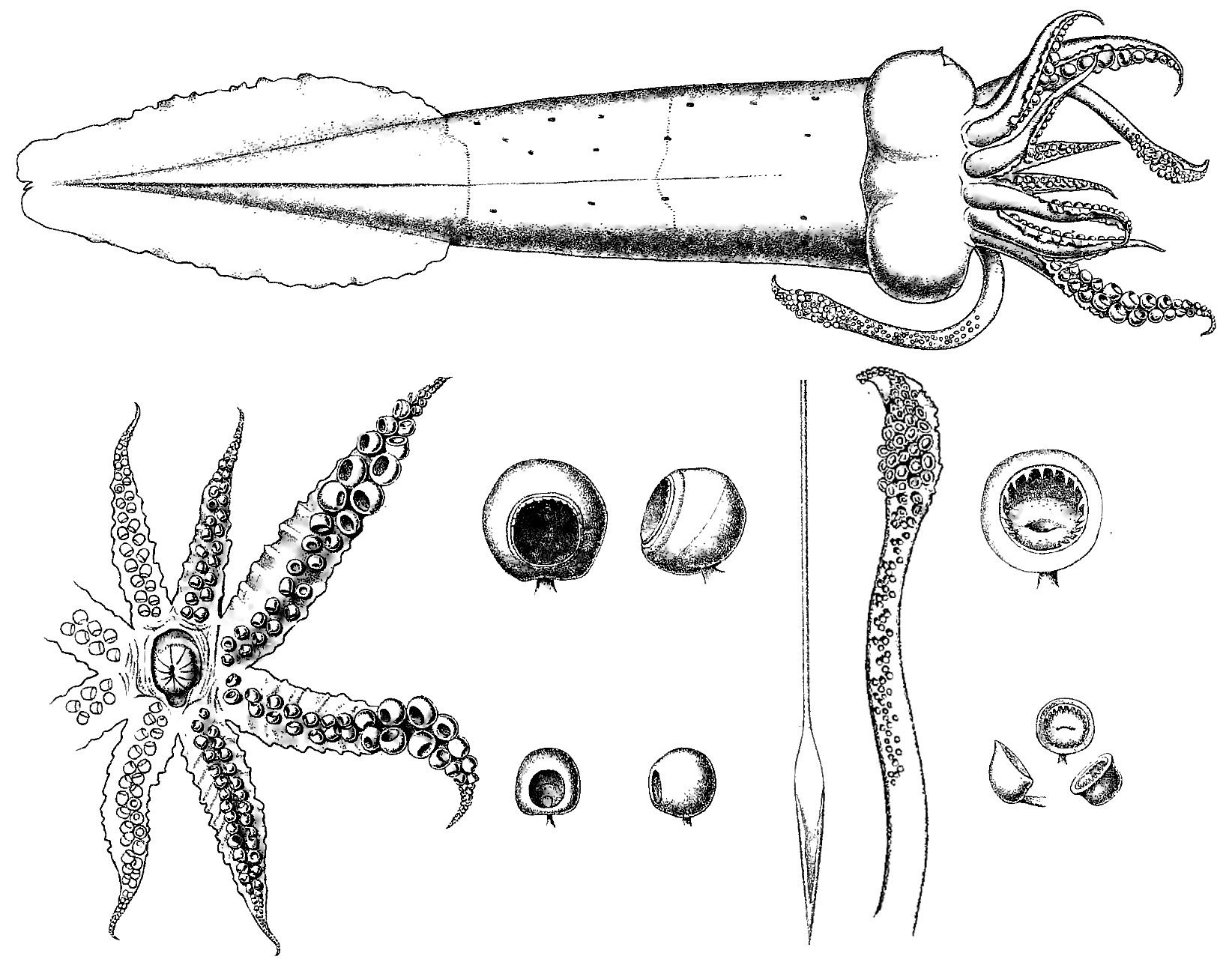
Drawings of Teuthowenia megalops by Hoyle

Dr William Evans Hoyle FRSE (28 January 1855 – 7 February 1926) was a British zoologist. A specialist in deep sea creatures, he worked on classification and illustrations from the Challenger expedition from 1882 to 1888.

== Life ==
Hoyle was born in Manchester, the son of William Jennings Hoyle, an engraver.

He was educated at Owens College and at Exeter College and Christ Church, Oxford where he obtained a Bachelor of Arts in 1877, Master of Arts in 1882 and a Doctor of Science, he was also Member of the Royal College of Surgeons.

He was the Director of the Manchester Museum from 1889 to 1909 and then was the first director of the National Museum of Wales from 1909 up to his retirement in 1926. Trained as a medical anatomist, Hoyle is most famous for his monographic studies on cephalopods from major exploring expeditions of his era including the Challenger, the Albatross, the British National Antarctic Expedition and the Scottish National Antarctic Expedition.

In 1883 he was elected a Fellow of the Royal Society of Edinburgh. His proposers were Sir John Murray, Morrison Watson, John Gray McKendrick and James Cossar Ewart.

He was elected to membership of the Manchester Literary and Philosophical Society 15 October 1889 giving his address as Director of the Welsh National Museum, Cardiff. City Hall.

Hoyle authored many first descriptions of cephalopods, including (but not limited to) those tabled below.

Cephalopods first described by William Evans Hoyle
Genus	species	Common name	Year
Hapalochlaena	maculosa	Southern blue-ringed octopus	1883
Metasepia	pfefferi	Flambuoyant cuttlefish	1885
Muusoctopus	levis		1885
Octopus	australis	Hammer octopus	1885
Octopus	hongkongensis		1885
Octopus	pallidus	Pale octopus	1885
Octopus	vitiensis		1885
Pyroteuthis		Fire squid	1904
Sepia	cultrata	Knifebone cuttlefish or Elongated cuttlefish	1885
Sepia	kiensis		1885
Sepia	novaehollandiae	New Holland cuttlefish	1909
Sepia	papuensis	Papuan cuttlefish	1885
Sepia	smithi	Smith's cuttlefish	1885

In 1906 he served as President of the Museums Association of Great Britain.

He died in Porthcawl in Wales on 7 February 1926.

== Family ==
He married twice: firstly in 1883 to Edith Isabel Sharp (d.1916); secondly in 1918 to Mrs Florence Ethel Mabel Hallett, a widow.

== Artistic recognition ==
There is a portrait of Hoyle in oils at the National Museum of Wales.
