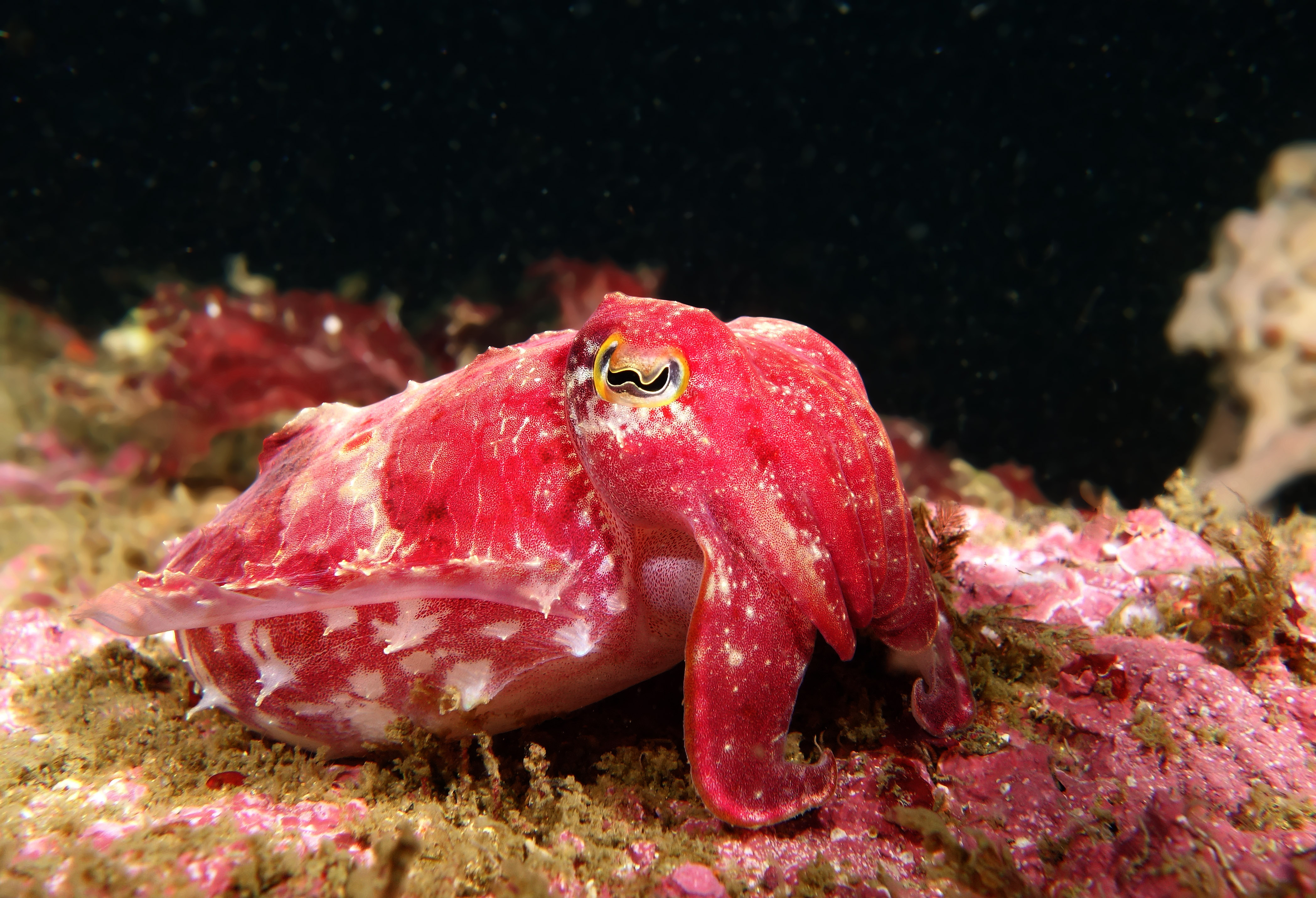

Conservation status
- Least Concern (IUCN 3.1)

Scientific classification
- Kingdom: Animalia
- Phylum: Mollusca
- Class: Cephalopoda
- Order: Sepiida
- Family: Sepiidae
- Genus: Ascarosepion
- Species: A. mestus

Binomial name
- Ascarosepion mestus (Gray, 1849)

Synonyms
- Sepia mestus Gray 1849; Ascarosepion verreauxi Rochebrune, 1884; Solitosepia liliana Iredale, 1926

= Ascarosepion mestus =

Species of cuttlefish

Ascarosepion mestus, also known as the reaper cuttlefish or red cuttlefish, is a species of cuttlefish native to the southwestern Pacific Ocean, specifically Escape Reef off Queensland (15°47′S 145°47′E) to Murrays Beach off Jervis Bay (35°08′S 150°46′E). Reports of this species from China and Vietnam are now known to be misidentifications. A. mestus lives at a depth of between 0 and 22 m.

Ascarosepion mestus exhibits sexual dimorphism. Females grow to a mantle length (ML) of 124 millimetres (4.9 in), while males do not exceed 77 mm (3.0 in) ML.

The type specimen was collected off the Australian coast and is deposited at The Natural History Museum in London.

Ascarosepion was revived as a genus in 2023; as the genus was named using a specimen of this species, Sepia mestus is thus the type species of Ascarosepion.

== Anatomy ==
Cuttlefish generally share many similar anatomical structures and it can be hard to distinguish between different species in certain situations. Generally, cuttlefish can be diagnosed posthumously based on mantle shape and the structure of their tentacular clubs, which remain concealed in life. All cephalopods have a similar basic anatomical plan. Structures include a set of limbs that diverge from the head in a ring around the mouth. Major body parts such as reproductive systems, digestive organs and the gills are contained in the mantle (a muscular bag) at the posterior portion of the animal.

Cuttlefish including A. mestus differ from octopuses as they have an additional pair of limbs that octopuses lack. These limbs are known as feeding tentacles. These tentacles are found between arms three and four. The feeding tentacles are typically used to capture prey by rapid extension. They are further differentiated by having a rigid body supported by a cuttlebone; this mantle is distinct, whereas in octopuses the head and mantle surface have fused together.

Ascarosepion mestus is commonly referred to as the red cuttlefish. When undisturbed it is typically recognized by its red colouration and two dark spots on the posterior of the animal.

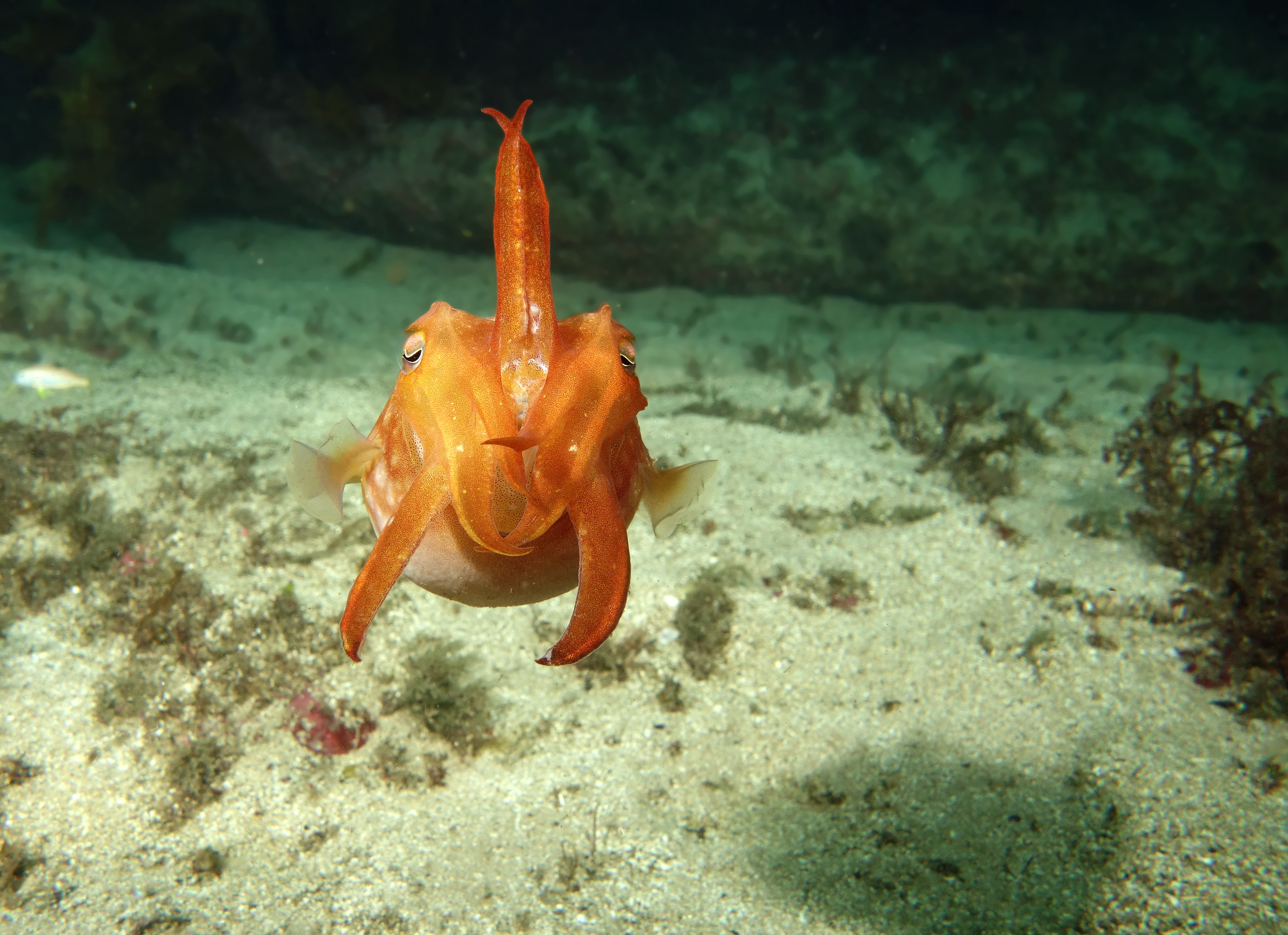
A photo of A. mestus swimming.

A. mestus can see contrast between stripes in what is called the polarizing drum.

=== Movement ===
A. mestus propels itself through the water using a technique that is seen in many cephalopods. Water is pushed through a cavity that is formed by the mantle. The animal ejects water from the mantle via a tubular funnel. This technique allows the animal to move through the environment using jet propulsion. A relaxed mantle allows for water to fill the mantle cavity. A contracted mantle forces water out through the tubular funnel. The funnel can be pointed in different directions allowing for movement forward and backward away from predators or towards prey.

== Range ==
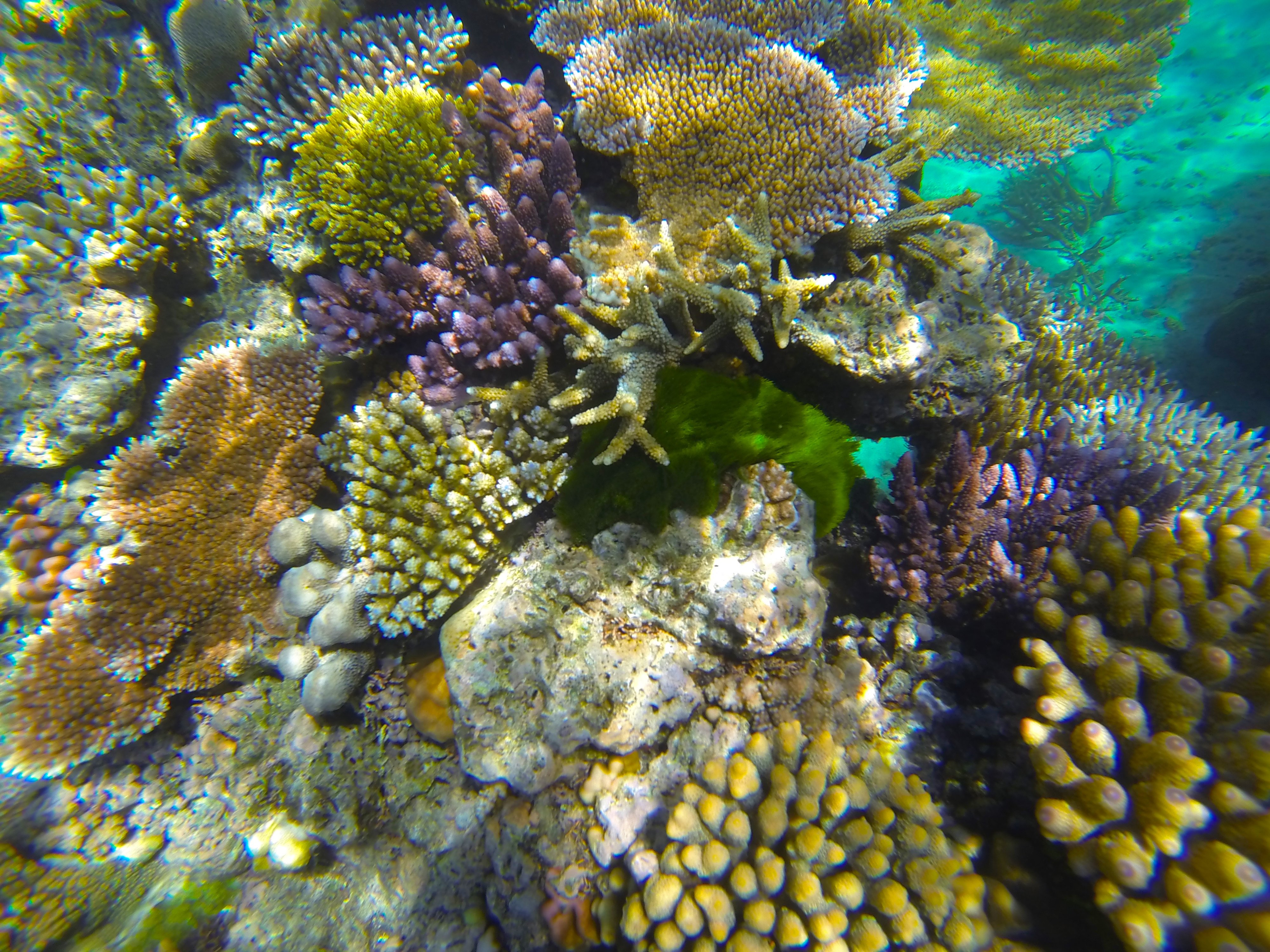
The Great barrier reef off the coast of north eastern Australia is a common habitat of A. mestus.

A. mestus is endemic to Australia (Reid et al. 2005), ranging along the east coast from northern Queensland to Jervis Bay in New South Wales (Reid et al.2005).

A. mestus lives in depths up to 22 m (72 ft) and inhabits a tropical climate. They typically live on rocky reefs and are typically seen under ledges (Norman 2003).

Many of the world's cuttlefish species are found in Australian waters, including A. mestus.

== Ecology ==
Some common predators of A. mestus include bluefish, summer flounder, and black seabass.

Common prey of A. mestus and other cuttlefish include different species of shrimp, crab, and young fish.

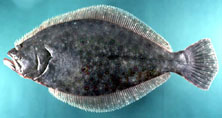
A photo of summer flounder (Paralichthys dentatus), a common predator of A. mestus

=== Anti-predator behaviour ===
Video of A. mestus hunting in waters off Sydney. (2014)

Camouflage is a distinctive feature of cephalopods, including A. mestus. Coleoid cephalopods can change their colour and texture instantaneously to avoid detection.

Small organs in the skin called chromatophores allow for colour change. These chromatophores are very small expandable bags of dense pigment in which a spot of particular colour can be displayed.

A. mestus and most other species of cuttlefish can also alter skin texture to blend in with their environment. They push up specialized flaps of skin called papillae to match shapes of rock, coral, and seaweed. When a cuttlefish contracts the rings of muscle around the base of the papillae in different ways, the flaps rise accordingly, changing the appearance of the animal.

A. mestus can also bury itself under the sand to avoid predators.

=== Life cycle and mating behaviour ===
To attract a potential mate, a male will perform various displays to catch the attention of a female. Once a male is successful in attracting a mate, the male will insert the hectocotylus into the female's mantle cavity to fertilize the female. The female will then lay her eggs nearby. All cuttlefish, including A. mestus, disperse their eggs by attachment to the sea floor, usually on or under hard surfaces such as rock and coral.

After spawning and brooding, male and female adults usually die shortly after. Like most members of the class Cephalopoda, A. mestus are gonochoric. After the embryos develop for about two months, they will hatch and remain in a planktonic stage briefly before developing into adults.

== Threats ==
Increasing levels of carbon dioxide in the atmosphere cause ocean acidification and are potentially a threat to all cuttlefish species. In high CO_{2} concentrations, cuttlefishes tend to lay down a denser cuttlebone, which could impair cuttlefish buoyancy regulation (Gutowska et al. 2010). The species is currently considered of least concern.
