= Cuttlebone =

Hard, brittle internal structure found in all members of the family Sepiidae

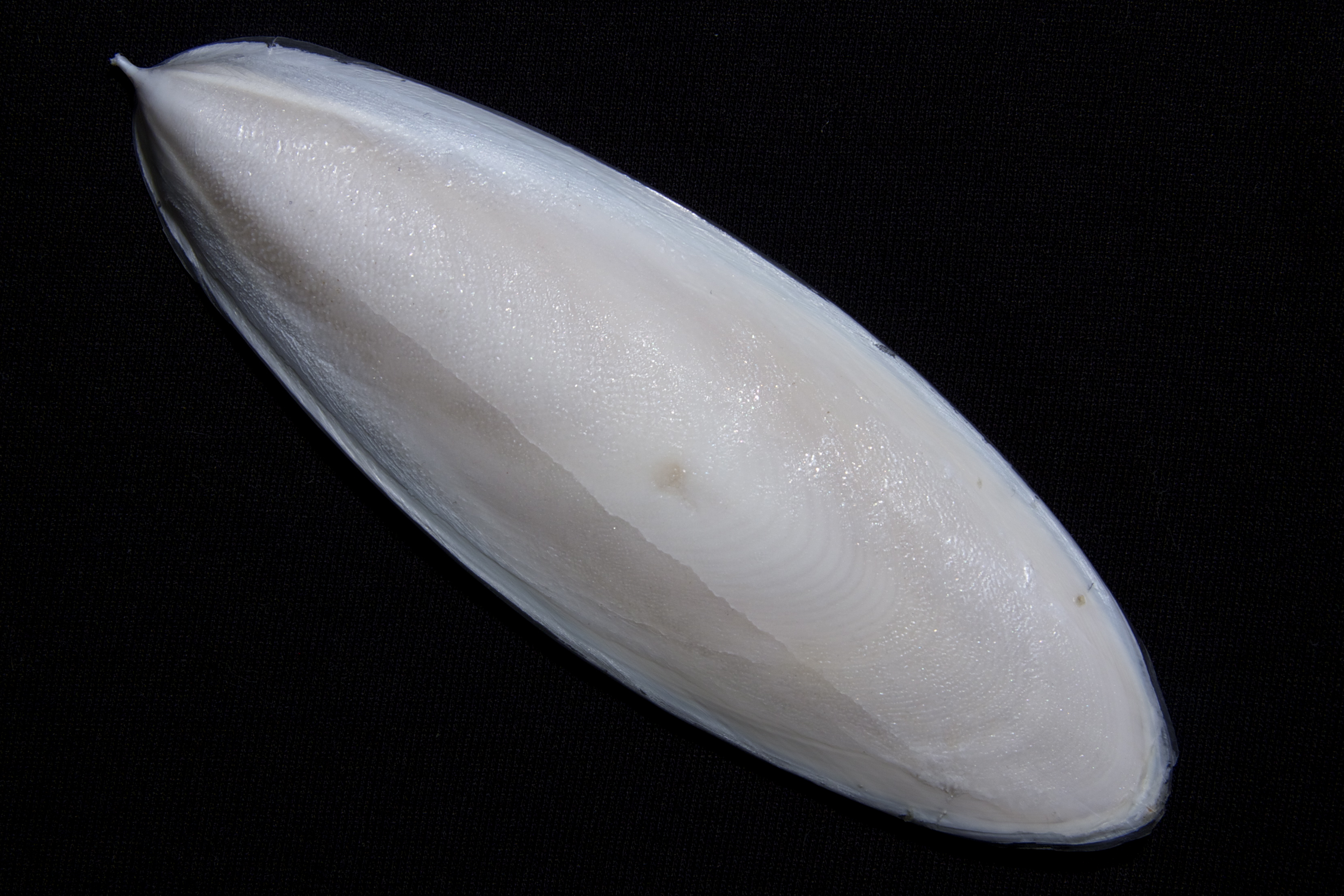
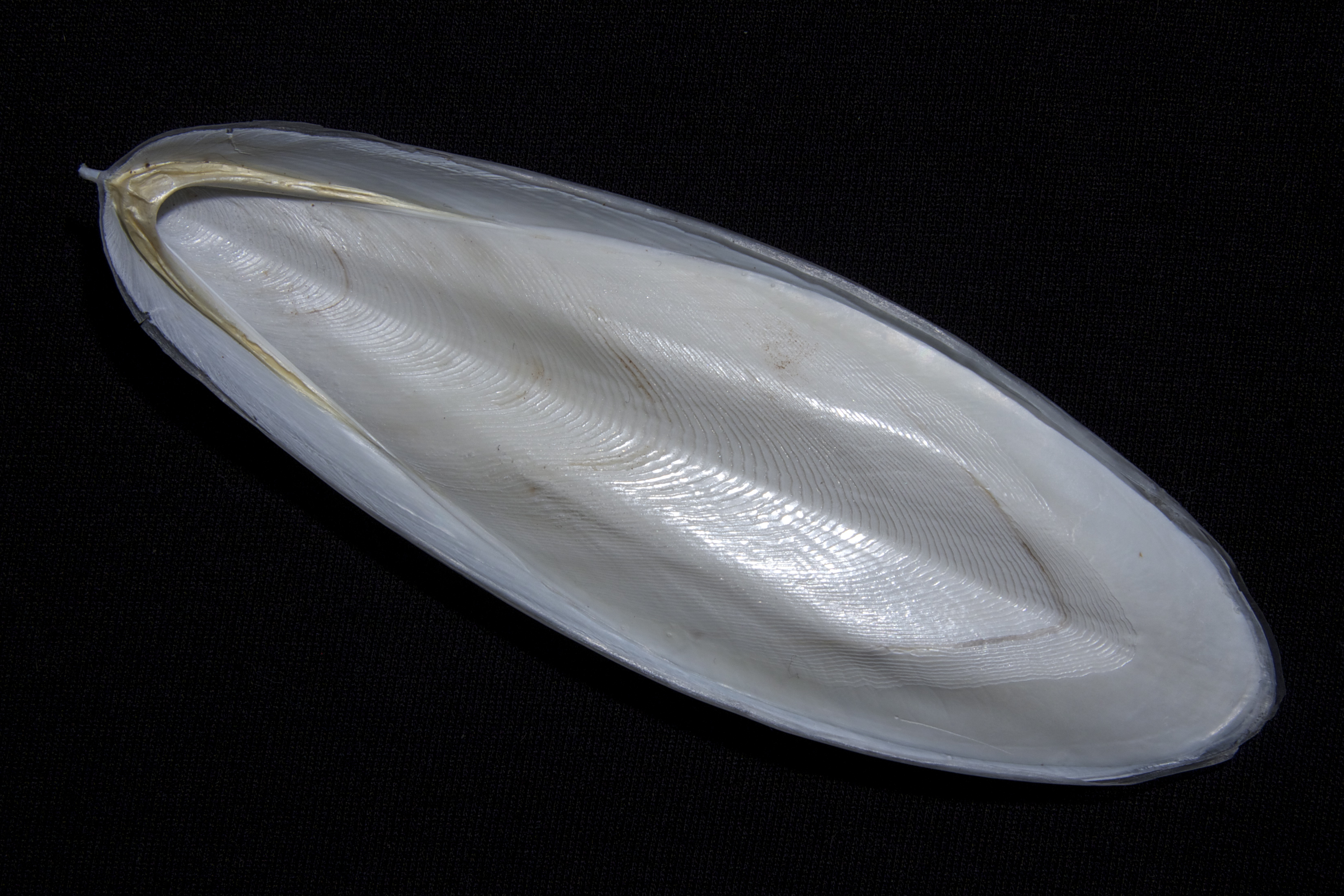
Top and bottom view of a cuttlebone, the buoyancy organ and internal shell of a cuttlefish.

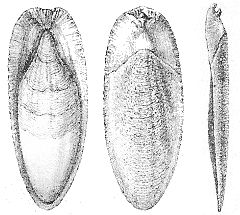
Cuttlebone of Sepia officinalis (left to right: ventral, dorsal, and lateral views). The cuttlebone is about 15cm in length.

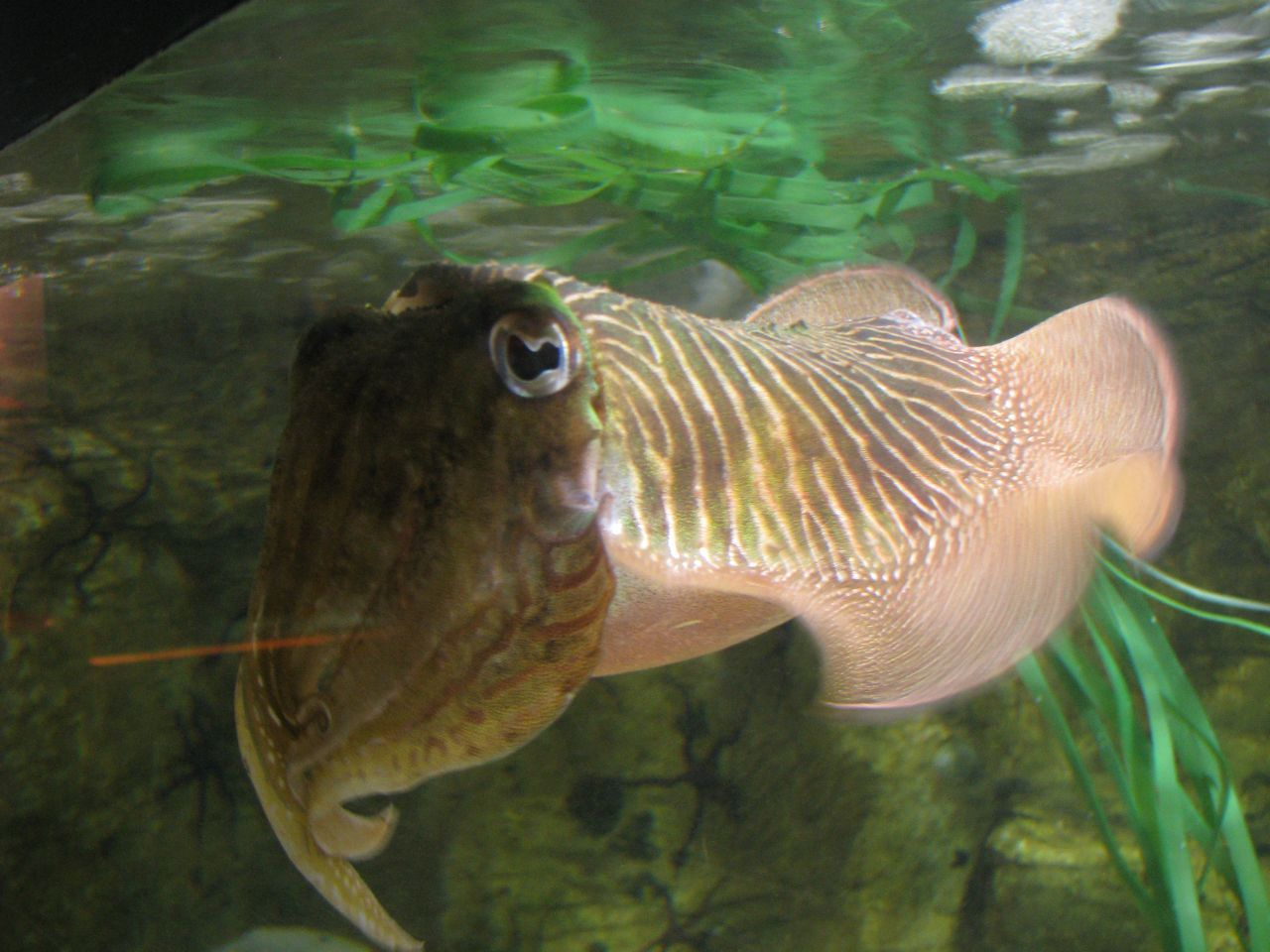
Common cuttlefish Sepia officinalis

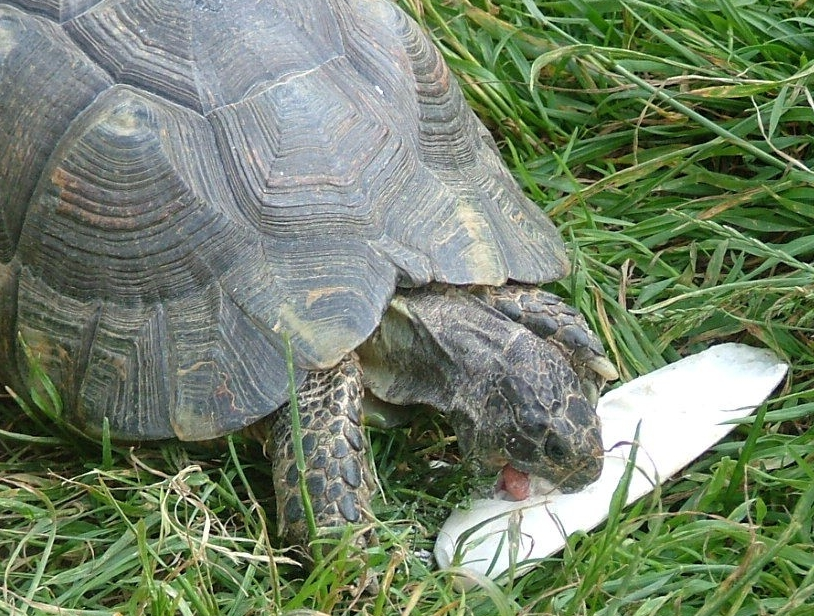
Tortoise with cuttlebone

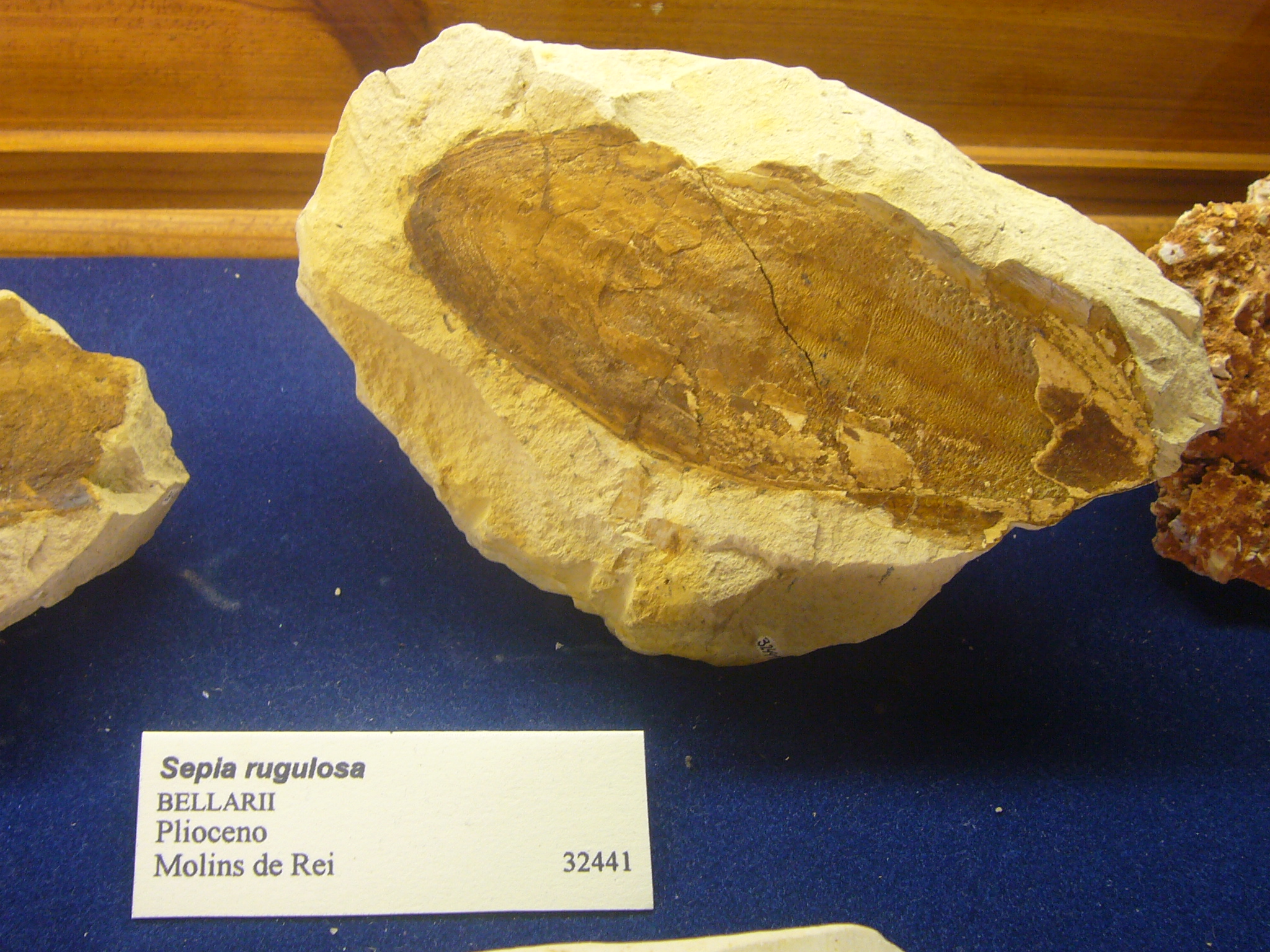
Fossil cuttlebone of the Pliocene species Sepia rugulosa

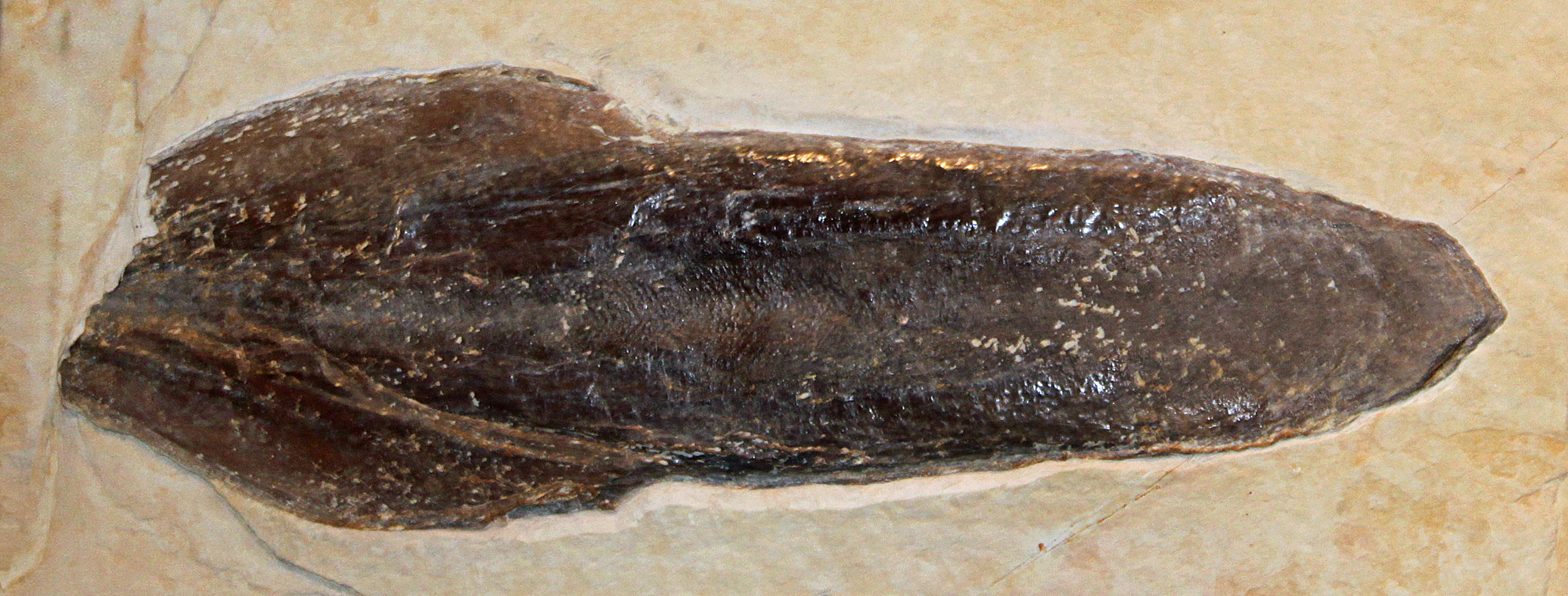
Fossilised cuttlebone-like gladius of Trachyteuthis

Cuttlebone, also known as cuttlefish bone, is a hard, brittle internal structure (an internal shell) found in all members of the family Sepiidae, commonly known as cuttlefish, within the cephalopods. In other cephalopod families it is called a gladius.

Cuttlebone is composed primarily of aragonite. It is a chambered structure that the animal can fill with gas or liquid for buoyancy control. On the ventral (bottom) side of the cuttlebone is the highly modified siphuncle; this is the organ with which the cuttlebone is filled with gas or liquid. The microscopic structure of cuttlebone consists of narrow layers connected by numerous upright pillars.

Depending on the species, cuttlebones implode at a depth of 200 to 600 metres (660 to 1,970 ft). Because of this limitation, most species of cuttlefish live on the seafloor in shallow water, usually on a continental shelf.

Upon the death of a cuttlefish, its body decomposes, leaving only the cuttlebone, which often washes up on beaches.

== Human uses ==
In the past, cuttlebones were ground up to make polishing powder, which was used by goldsmiths. The powder was also added to toothpaste, and was used as an antacid for medicinal purposes or as an absorbent. They were also used as an artistic carving medium during the 19th and 20th centuries.

=== Bird calcium supplement ===
Today, cuttlebones are commonly used as calcium-rich dietary supplements for caged birds, chinchillas, hermit crabs, reptiles, shrimp, snails, and laying hens. These are not intended for human consumption. They are commonly available at pet stores.

=== Lime production ===
As a carbonate-rich biogenic raw material, cuttlebone has potential to be used in the production of calcitic lime.

=== Jewelry making ===
Because cuttlebone is able to withstand high temperatures and is easily carved, it serves as mold-making material for small metal castings for the creation of jewelry and small sculptural objects. (Note: Jewelers prepare cuttlebone for use as a mold by cutting it in half and rubbing the two sides together until they fit flush against one another. Then the casting can be done by carving a design into the cuttlebone, adding the necessary sprue, melting the metal in a separate pouring crucible, and pouring the molten metal into the mold through the sprue. Finally, the sprue is sawed off and the finished piece is polished.)

It can also be used in the process of pewter casting, as a mould.

== Internal structure ==
The microstructure of the cuttlebone consists of two components, horizontal septa and vertical pillars. Both components are composed predominantly of aragonite. The horizontal septa divide the cuttlebone into separate chambers. These chambers are supported by the vertical pillars which have a corrugated (or "wavy") structure. The thickness of these pillars varies from species to species, but are typically a few microns thick. The horizontal septa are typically thicker than the vertical pillars and consist of a double-layered structure. The upper layer of the septa and walls consist of vertically aligned crystals, whereas the bottom sublayer consists of nanorods rotated with respect to each other to form a "plywood" structure. Overall, this chambered microstructure results in the cuttlebone having a porosity over 90% by volume.

3D visualisation of a Sepia cuttlebone by industrial micro-computed tomography

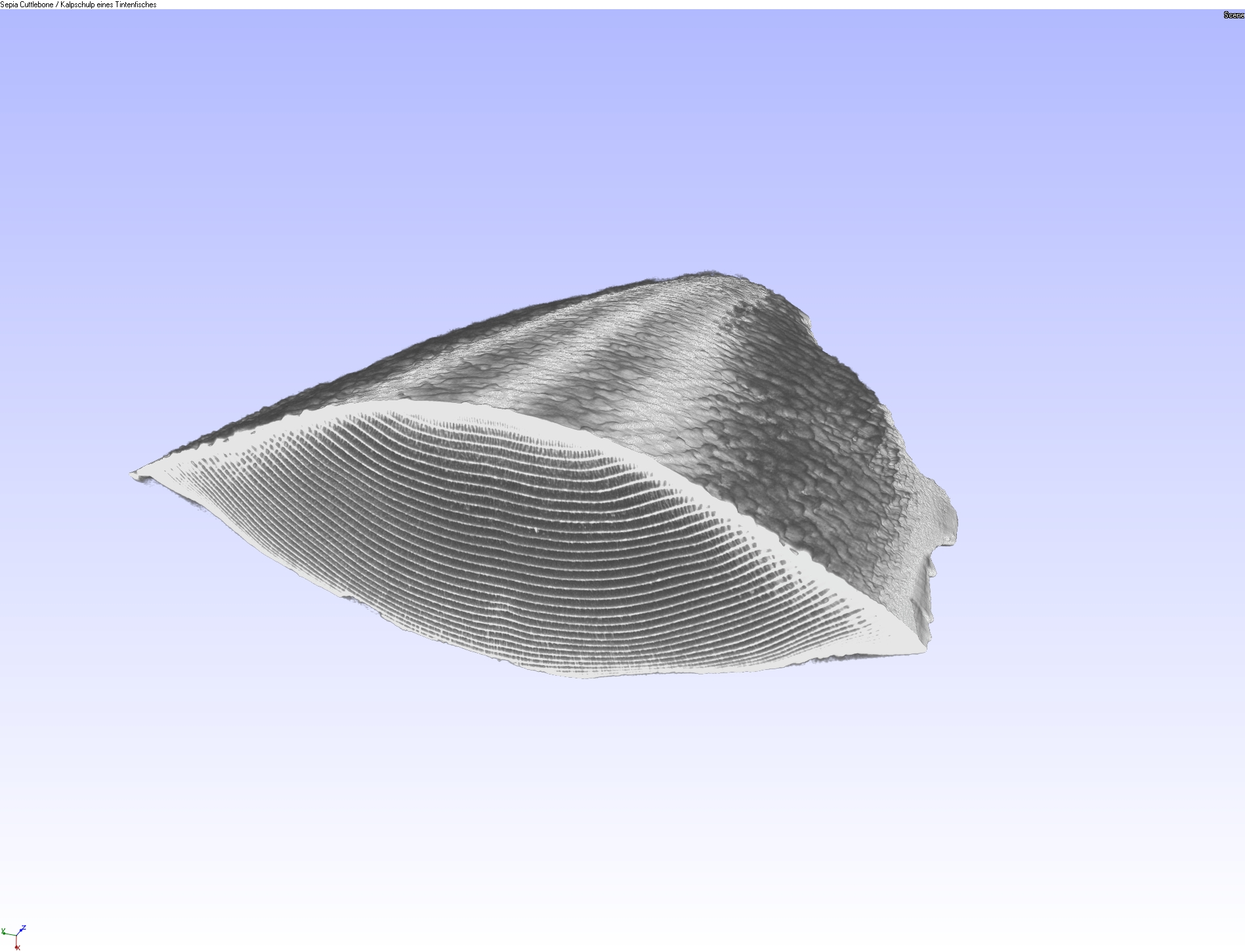
3D view of part of a cuttlebone at low resolution.

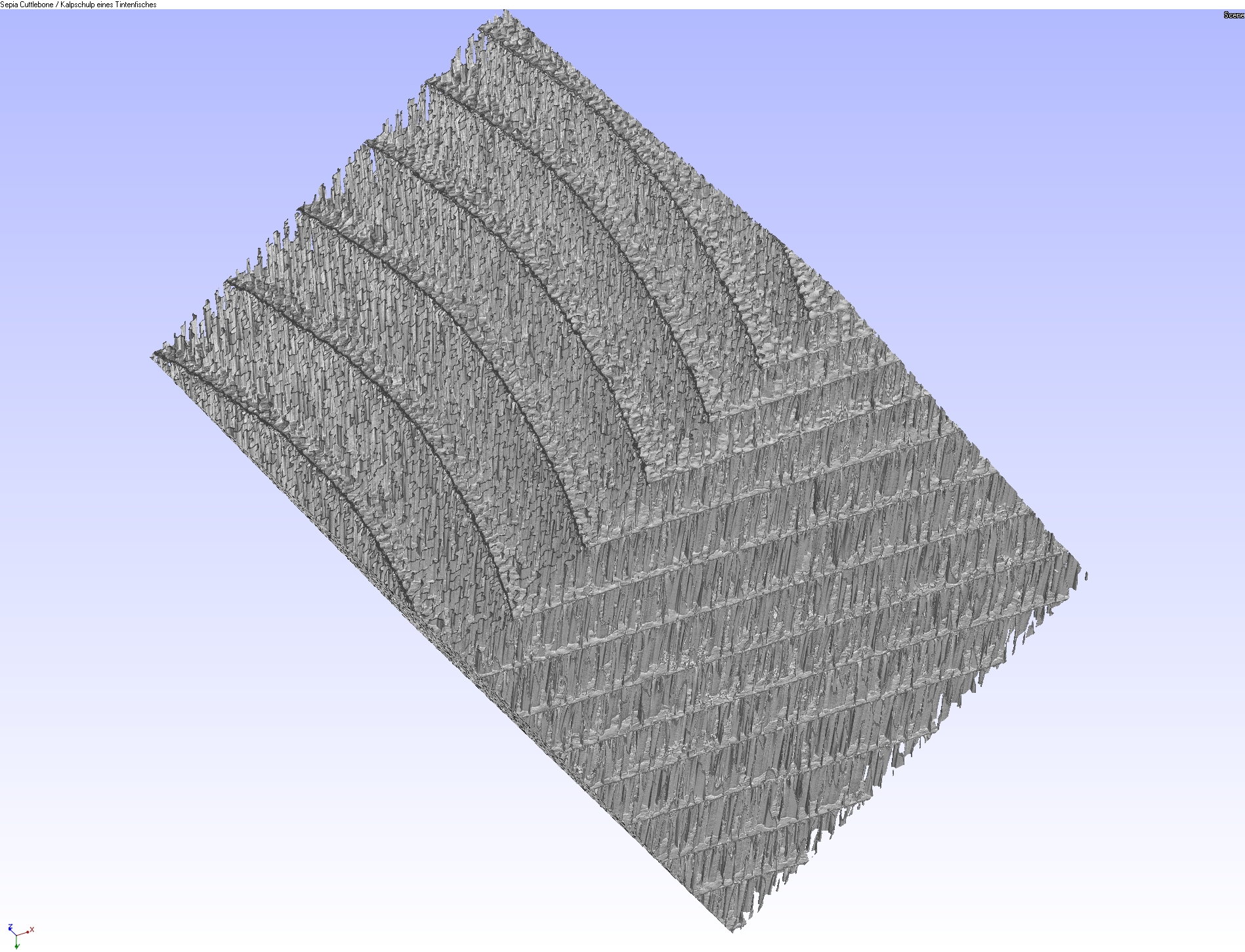
Overview of a part at high resolution, about 5 μm/voxel.

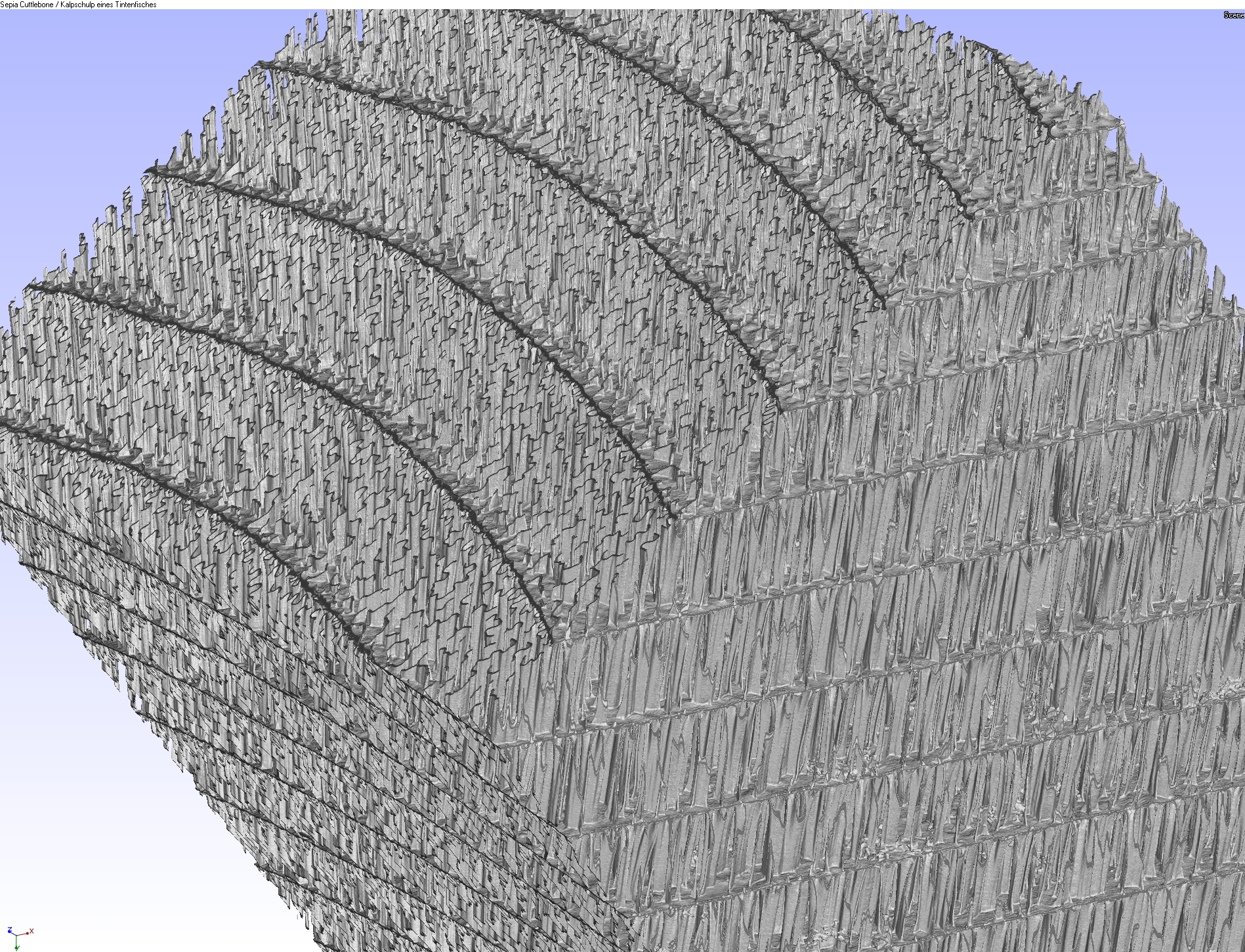
Higher magnification.

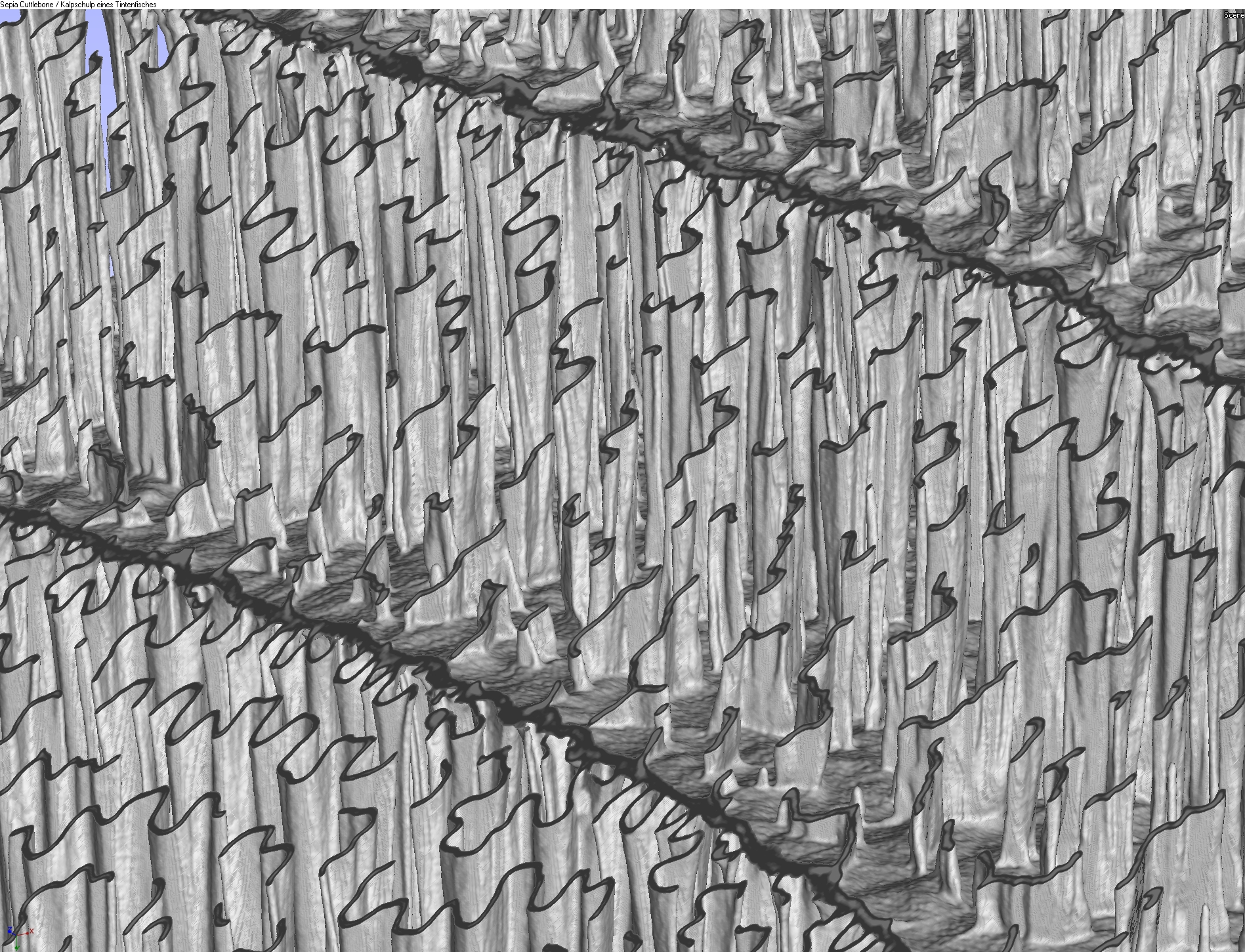
Detailed view at very high magnification. Wall thickness of the vertical structures is about 10 μm.
Flight through the corresponding tomographic image stacks

Flight through the corresponding μCT image stack, section direction about 30°, lateral view.

Flight through the corresponding μCT image stack, section direction about 30°, top view.

Flight through the aligned image stack, lateral view.

Flight through the aligned image stack, top view.

Flight through the aligned image stack, top view, magnified section.

== Mechanical properties ==
The cuttlebone has been studied extensively due to its ability to be simultaneously lightweight, stiff, and tolerant to damage. This combination of mechanical properties has led to research into cuttlebone-inspired biomimetic ceramic foams. In addition, due to its mechanical properties, cuttlebone has been used as scaffolding in superconductors and tissue engineering applications. The light weight of the cuttlebone derives from its high porosity (over 90% by volume). The stiffness of the cuttlebone arises from the chambered structure composition of approximately 95% aragonite (a stiff material) and 5% organic material. Since the stiffness of a composite will be dominated by the material with the largest volume fraction, the cuttlebone is also stiff. The specific stiffness of the cuttlebone in one species was measured to be as high as 8.4 [(MN)m/kg]. The most intriguing property of cuttlebone is its ability to tolerate damage given that aragonite is a brittle material. The high tolerance to damage can be linked to the cuttlebone's unique microstructure.

=== Deformation process ===
Due to the marine lifestyle of the cuttlefish, the cuttlebone must be capable of both withstanding large compressive forces from the water while avoiding sudden brittle failure. The cuttlebone of some species under compression has demonstrated a specific energy on par with some advanced foams made from more compliant materials such as metals and polymers. The high energy absorption is a result of several factors.

The failure of the cuttlebone occurs in three distinct stages: local crack formation, crack expansion, and densification. Crack formation typically occurs in the middle of the vertical walls in the chambered structure of the cuttlebone. The location of crack formation is controlled by the waviness in the corrugated structure of the walls. The waviness of the walls in the cuttlebone provides an optimized balance between stiffness and brittleness of the overall structure. This wavy structure inhibits crack propagation, increasing the energy input necessary for failure. After sufficient damage has occurred to the walls of the cuttlebone, a process known as densification occurs whereby the walls gradually compact while fracture continues. Significant energy is dissipated in the continued cracking of the walls while densification is occurring. It has also been observed that under compressive stresses, the horizontally layered chambers of the cuttlebone will fail sequentially. While one chamber is undergoing fracture and densification, the other chambers will not deform until the septum between the chambers has been penetrated. The septum is significantly stronger than the vertical walls due to its "plywood" structure further increasing the total energy needed for complete structural failure of the cuttlebone.

== See also ==
- Argonaut (animal)
- Belemnoidea
- Gladius (cephalopod)
- Mollusc shell
- Nautilus
