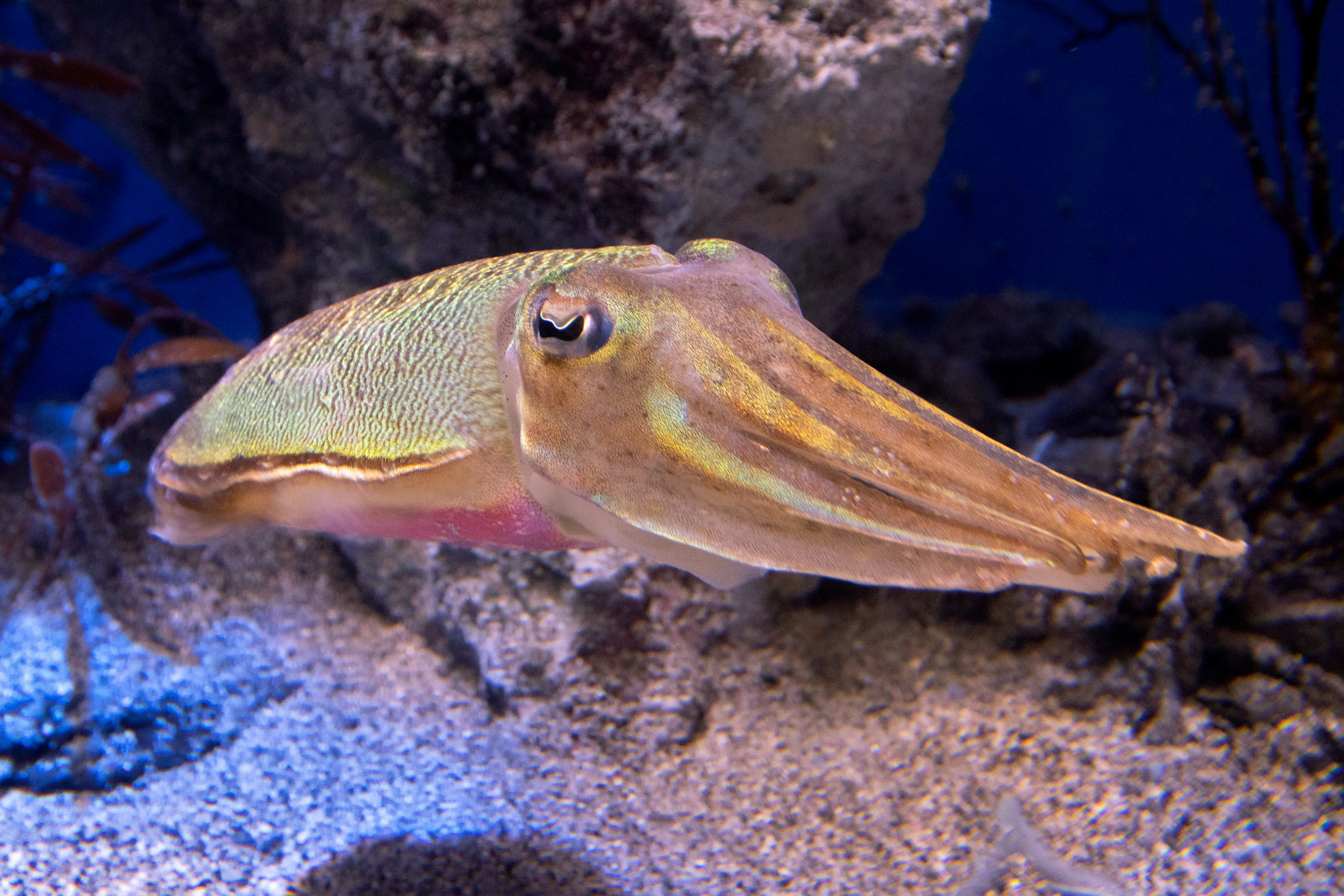

Conservation status
- Data Deficient (IUCN 3.1)

Scientific classification
- Kingdom: Animalia
- Phylum: Mollusca
- Class: Cephalopoda
- Order: Sepiida
- Family: Sepiidae
- Genus: Acanthosepion
- Species: A. lycidas

Binomial name
- Acanthosepion lycidas Gray, 1849

= Acanthosepion lycidas =

Species of cuttlefish

Acanthosepion lycidas, commonly known as the kisslip cuttlefish, is a species of cuttlefish within the genus Acanthosepion. They are also classified under the family Sepiidae, which encompasses some of the most commonly known and recognized cuttlefish. Phylogenetically, this species of cuttlefish is most closely related to Acanthosepion aculeata, Acanthosepion esculenta, and Acanthosepion pharaonis. This species is typically reddish brown to purple in color, with patches and stripes present on their dorsal mantle. On average, they grow to be about 38 cm in length and weigh 5 kg at maximum. The kisslip cuttlefish can be found mainly within the Indo-West Pacific, at depths ranging from 15–100 meters. Additionally, this species exhibits many diverse, complex reproductive behaviors; for example, courting, mating displays, and mate competition. Other interesting behaviors includes their feeding and hunting methods, which entails turning towards a preferred direction to "jump on" and engulf their prey of small fish and crustaceans. Acanthosepion lycidas has many human uses and is important in the economy of many Southeast Asian countries, especially since they are often eaten for their high nutritional value. They are also currently being studied as an alternative source of collagen for human use, since their thick outer skin contain high levels of collagen that goes to waste when they are eaten or caught as bycatch.

== Description ==
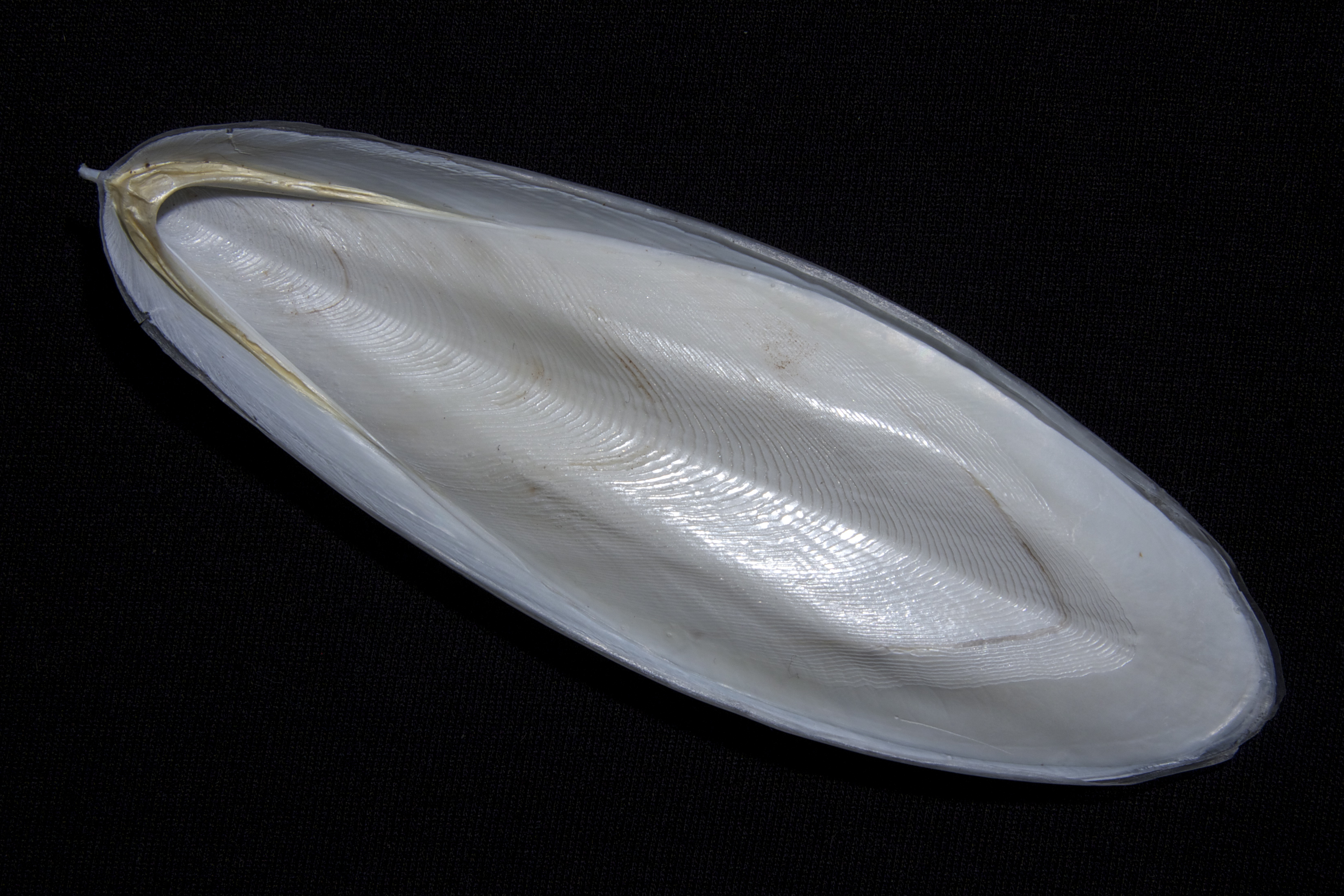
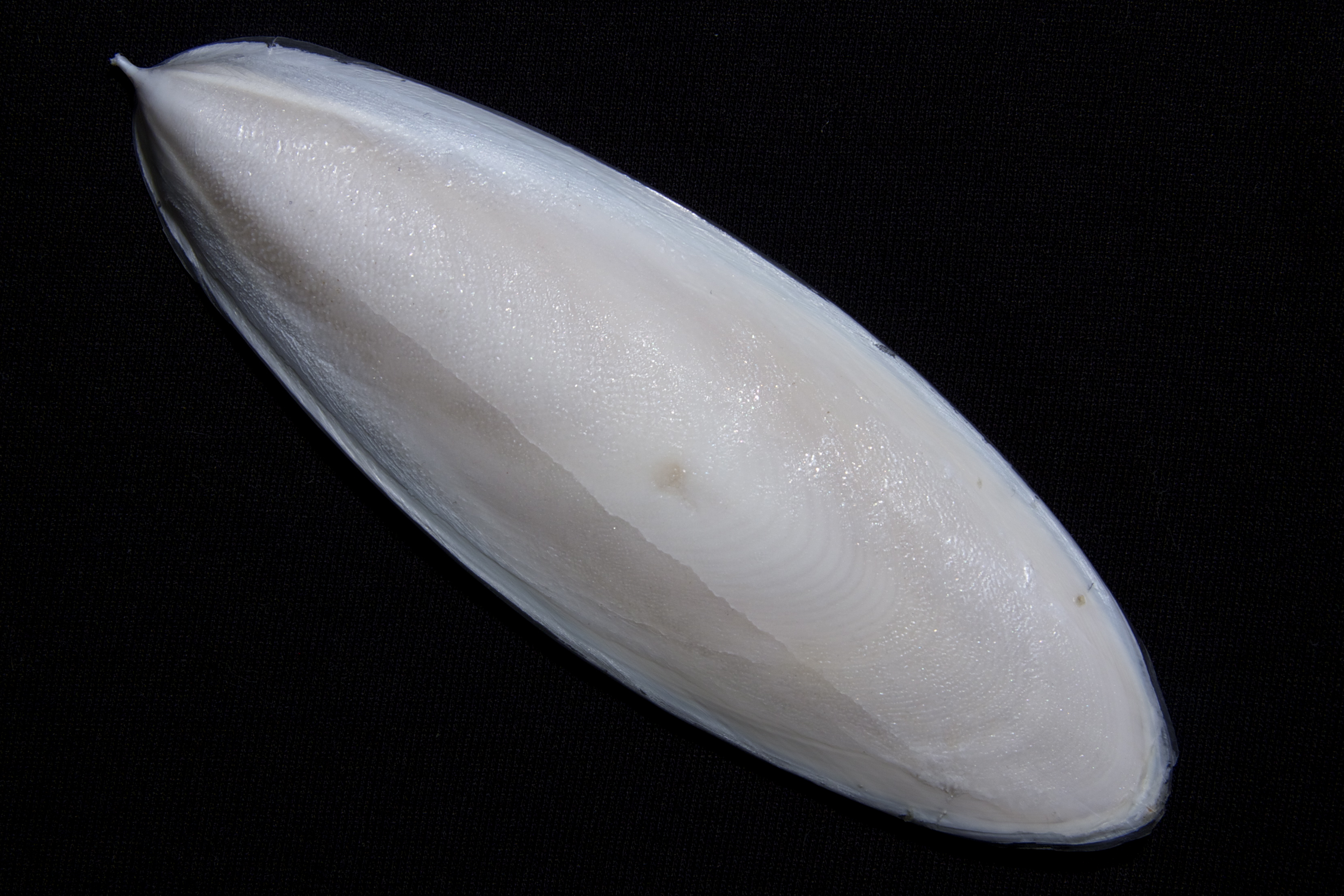
Ventral and dorsal view of cuttlebone

The cuttlebone, which is usually ellipsoid in shape, is located within the dorsal mantle of the cuttlefish to provide individuals with many benefits like protection, support, and buoyancy. Acanthosepion lycidas is a common species of large cuttlefish, and will grow to have an average mantle size of 38 cm and a maximum weight of 5 kg. In general, cuttlefish have binocular vision and are able to assess the exact distance to a target with accuracy. Their coloring ranges from reddish brown to purple, and individuals have scattered ocellate patches and lightened stripes along their dorsal mantles. Additionally, this species has small suckers, all similar in size to one another, and has a hectocotylus present on their left ventral arm.

=== Cuttlebone curvature ===
Studies have shown a morphological asymmetry present in the cuttlebone curvature within the kisslip cuttlefish. The cuttlebone may be more convex, or more developed, on one side than it is the other, which causes the cuttlefish to exhibit preferences towards its right or left side when hunting prey. For example, the cuttlefish will typically turn towards its right side when hunting, if the cuttlebone is more convex on the right side than the left.

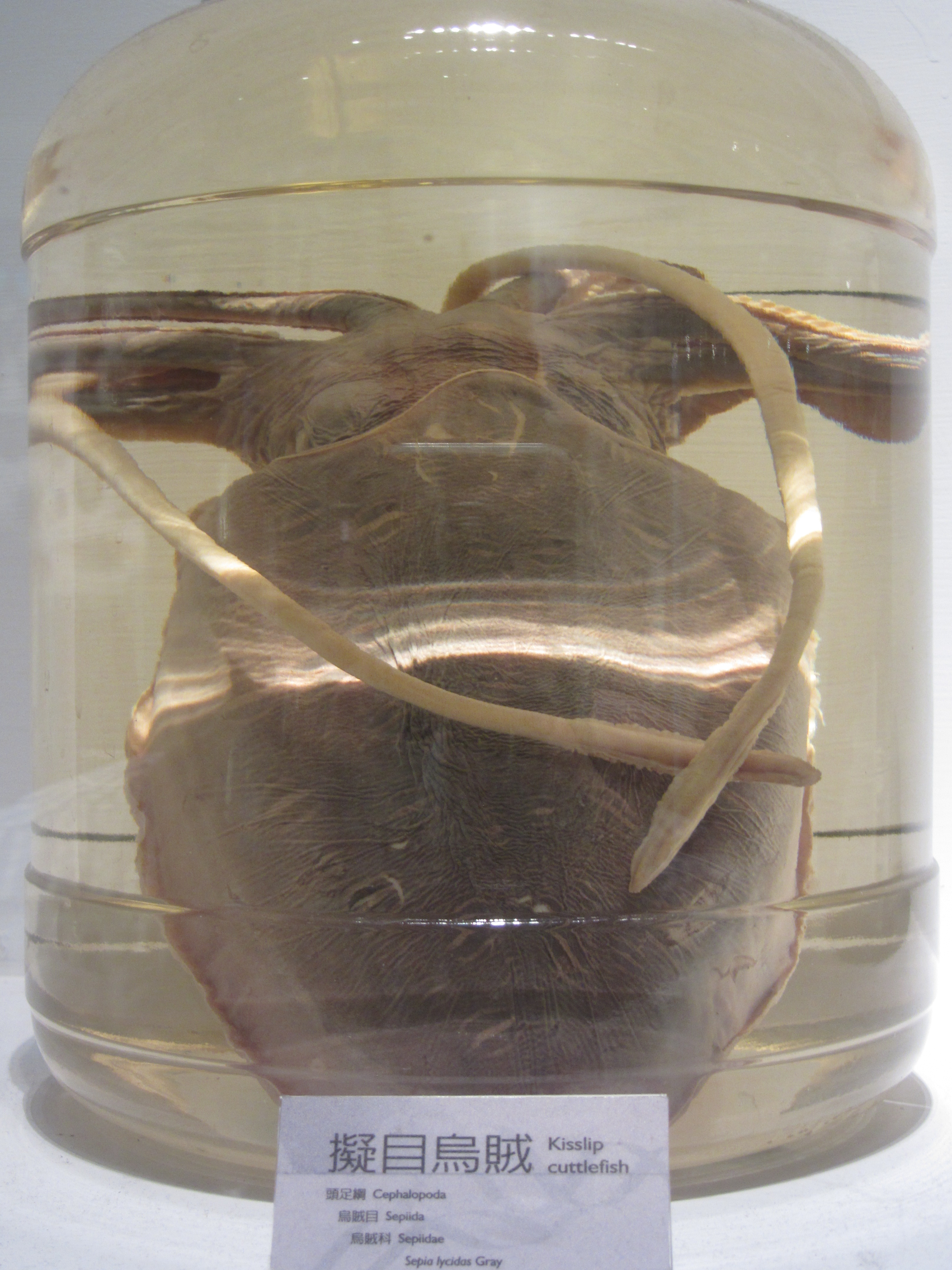
Specimen of Acanthosepion lycidas in the National Museum of Natural Science in Taiwan

== Distribution and habitat ==
Kisslip cuttlefish are native to the Indo-West Pacific (Indian Ocean/Western Pacific), specifically from Japan to Myanmar, Philippines, and Indonesia. They are also known to prefer tropical to temperate environments and temperatures. This species is benthic and only found within marine ecosystems. Acanthosepion lycidas can typically be found at depths ranging from 15–100 meters; however, they do migrate to shallow coastal areas from April to July for both the mating and breeding season. Specifically within the South China Sea, the kisslip cuttlefish resides in habitats that are covered with shells, gravel, sand, and seaweed, which is similar to both the pharaoh and broadclub cuttlefish.

== Behavior ==
=== Reproduction ===
Cephalopods in general are usually gonochoristic, meaning that an individual organism has only one of at least two distinct sexes. This species in particular has been used in many studies on various aspects of reproductive behaviors in cephalopods because they are easily bred and cultivated in captivity. When mating, males will perform displays to attract females to mate with. Then, during copulation, males will grasp the female and insert the hectocotylus into the female's mantle cavity. Within the mantle cavity is where fertilization typically occurs. Acanthosepion lycidas lay amber colored eggs shortly after fertilization takes place, that are similar in shape to hen eggs. Finally, this cuttlefish species has been observed displaying many complex reproductive behaviors, such as courtship, mating, males competing for mates, spawning during the breeding period, and male escorts.

==== Life cycle ====
Acanthosepion lycidas has a life cycle that is similar to other cuttlefish species, beginning with embryos hatching into a planktonic stage after about 25 days of incubation. Hatching times are vulnerable to changes in environmental conditions and can vary depending on light, temperature, and salinity. They continue to grow and develop through this planktonic stage until they are fully grown, benthic adults; however, juveniles will still show similar behaviors to benthic adults like burying themselves in the sand soon after hatching. Males reach sexual maturity at approximately 150 days after hatching, while females take longer to fully mature. Both males and females will usually die shortly after their spawning and brooding behaviors have ceased.

==== Gonadal sex differentiation ====
Gonadal sex differentiation is when an undifferentiated gonad transforms into either an ovary or a testes, typically occurring during embryonic development. This process was studied on a histological level within Acanthosepion lycidas and the results are applicable to similar cephalopod species, as well. The observations showing an undifferentiated gonad forming within cuttlefish embryos anywhere from 14–21 days after fertilization. A few days later, around 28 days into embryonic development (before hatching), is when sexual dimorphism begins and ovarian differentiation occurs. It is not until about 20 days after hatching that organisms will experience testicular differentiation. In another study, the Gonadotropin-releasing hormone-like peptide (GnRH-like) levels of kisslip cuttlefish were observed, since this peptide has been proven to play a significant role in some cephalopod reproductive behaviors. The results of this study showed that GnRH-like was present within the organism's brains even in an undifferentiated state, and that the levels did increase significantly once gonadal sex differentiation began to take place.

=== Diet and feeding ===
The kisslip cuttlefish feeds primarily on fish and crustaceans, especially shrimp, which they engulf by "jumping" on their selected prey. Additionally, studies have found that they exhibit a turning behavior when hunting, and will turn their bodies either clockwise or counterclockwise before engulfing their prey, which is an example of behavioral dimorphism within the species. The direction that the cuttlefish shows preference towards when turning and hunting is dependent on which side of their cuttlebone is further developed - a more developed right side leads to a clockwise preference and vice versa.

== Human uses ==
Acanthosepion lycidas have become very economically important in Southeast Asia, especially in Japan and Hong Kong since they are commonly eaten due to their high nutritional value. The way that cuttlefish are caught is dependent on the season, but they can be caught by hook, by using live cuttlefish lures, or through bycatch. Additionally, they have the opportunity to become an important species for commercial aquaculture because of their high food conversion, rapid population growth rates, and increasing growth in market value. Outside of aquaculture, this species is often used as a model organism and has been studied extensively as a potential alternative source of collagen, which humans use in cosmetics, biomedical materials, and foods. Large amounts of collagen can be obtained from the cuttlefish's thick outer skin, so if the thermal stability can be improved then this species will be a good source of collagen and will help to minimize the pollution and odor impacts caused by treating the cuttlefish skins as waste.

Unfortunately, due to overexploitation and insufficient recruitment, kisslip cuttlefish populations have declined dramatically in more recent years. This has been caused more specifically by fishing gear, bycatch, and overwintering of both adults and juveniles. The species is currently listed on the IUCN Red List as "Data Deficient" because more information is needed on the species to determine an accurate conservation status.

== Phylogeny ==
In recent years, the kisslip cuttlefish has been studied to expand knowledge of Sepiidae species' phylogenetic relationships and species geography. It was found that Acanthosepion lycidas have a genomic composition and order that's very similar to most other invertebrates, and, when compared 37 other cuttlefish species, they are most closely related to Acanthosepion aculeata, Acanthosepion esculenta, and Acanthosepion pharaonis. Overall, the kisslip cuttlefish's currently determined phylogeny is similar to its traditional taxonomy.
