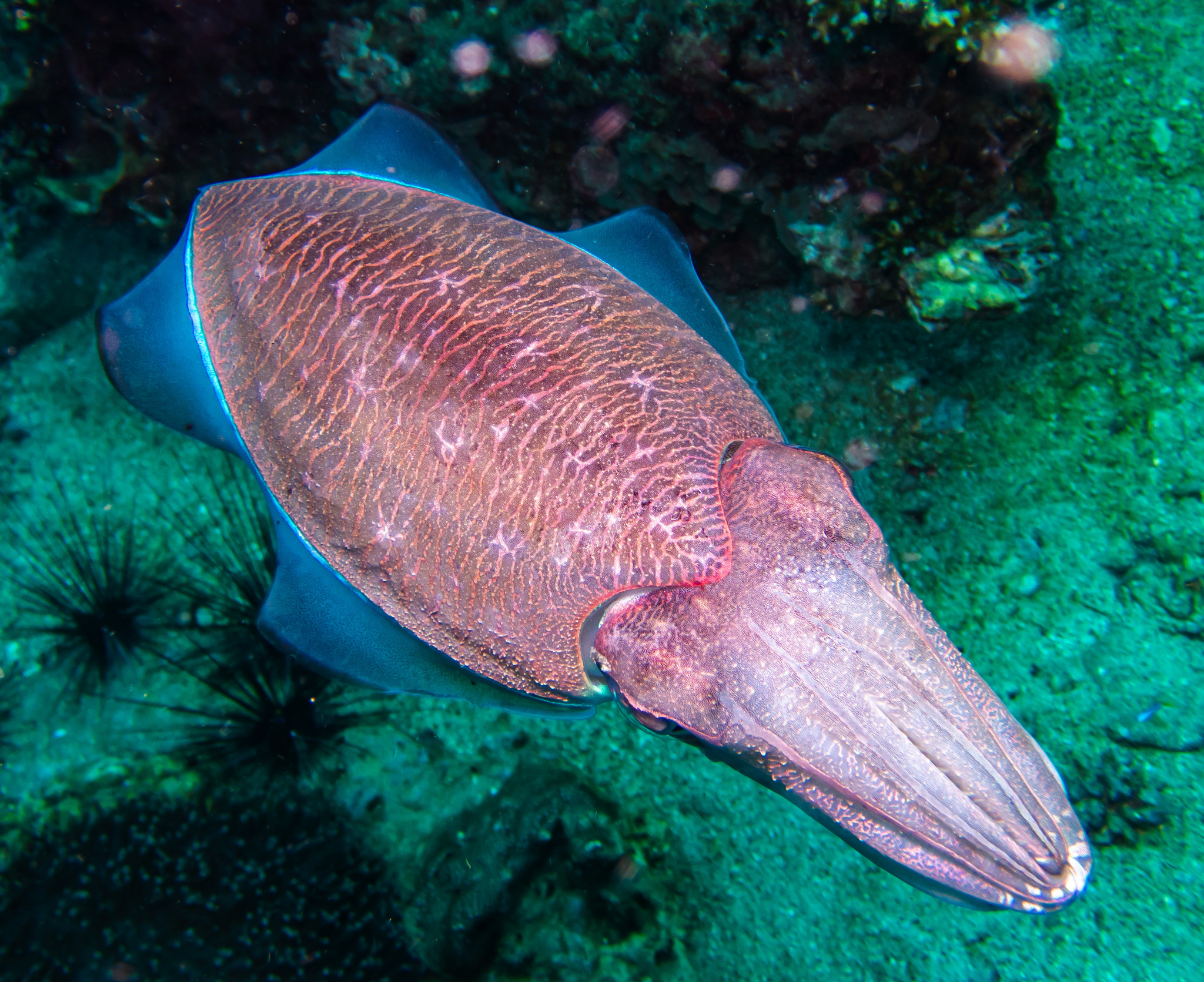
- Pharaoh cuttlefish (A. pharaonis)

Scientific classification
- Kingdom: Animalia
- Phylum: Mollusca
- Class: Cephalopoda
- Order: Sepiida
- Family: Sepiidae
- Genus: Acanthosepion; Rochebrune, 1884

Type species
- Acanthosepion aculeatum (d'Orbigny, 1835)

Species
- see text

Synonyms
- List: Sepia (Acanthosepion) Rochebrune, 1884; Platysepia Naef, 1923; Acanthosepion (Fiscisepia) Iredale, 1926; Crumenasepia Iredale, 1926; Sepia (Acanthosepia) Thiele, 1934

= Acanthosepion =

Genus of cuttlefishes

Acanthosepion is a genus of cuttlefish, long thought to be a subgenus of the cuttlefish type genus, Sepia. A 2023 paper revived several genera of cuttlefish and elevated some subgenera of Sepia to full genus level based on molecular sequencing; this study recovered Acanthosepion as a distinct clade of cuttlefish. Genus Acanthosepion was determined to range from the coast of South Africa and Western Australia up to the Red Sea, Persian Gulf, and north to Sakhalin. This classification scheme has been accepted by various databases, such as WoRMS, and GBIF.

The following species are accepted by WoRMS:

- Acanthosepion aculeatum (A. d'Orbigny, 1835)
- Acanthosepion ellipticum (Hoyle, 1885)
- Acanthosepion esculentum (Hoyle, 1885)
- Acanthosepion lycidas (J. E. Gray, 1849)
- Acanthosepion pharaonis (Ehrenberg, 1831)
- Acanthosepion ramani (Neethiselvan, 2001)
- Acanthosepion recurvirostrum (Steenstrup, 1875)
- Acanthosepion smithi (Hoyle, 1885)
- Acanthosepion stelliferum (Khomenko & Khromov, 1984)
- Acanthosepion whitleyanum Iredale, 1926
