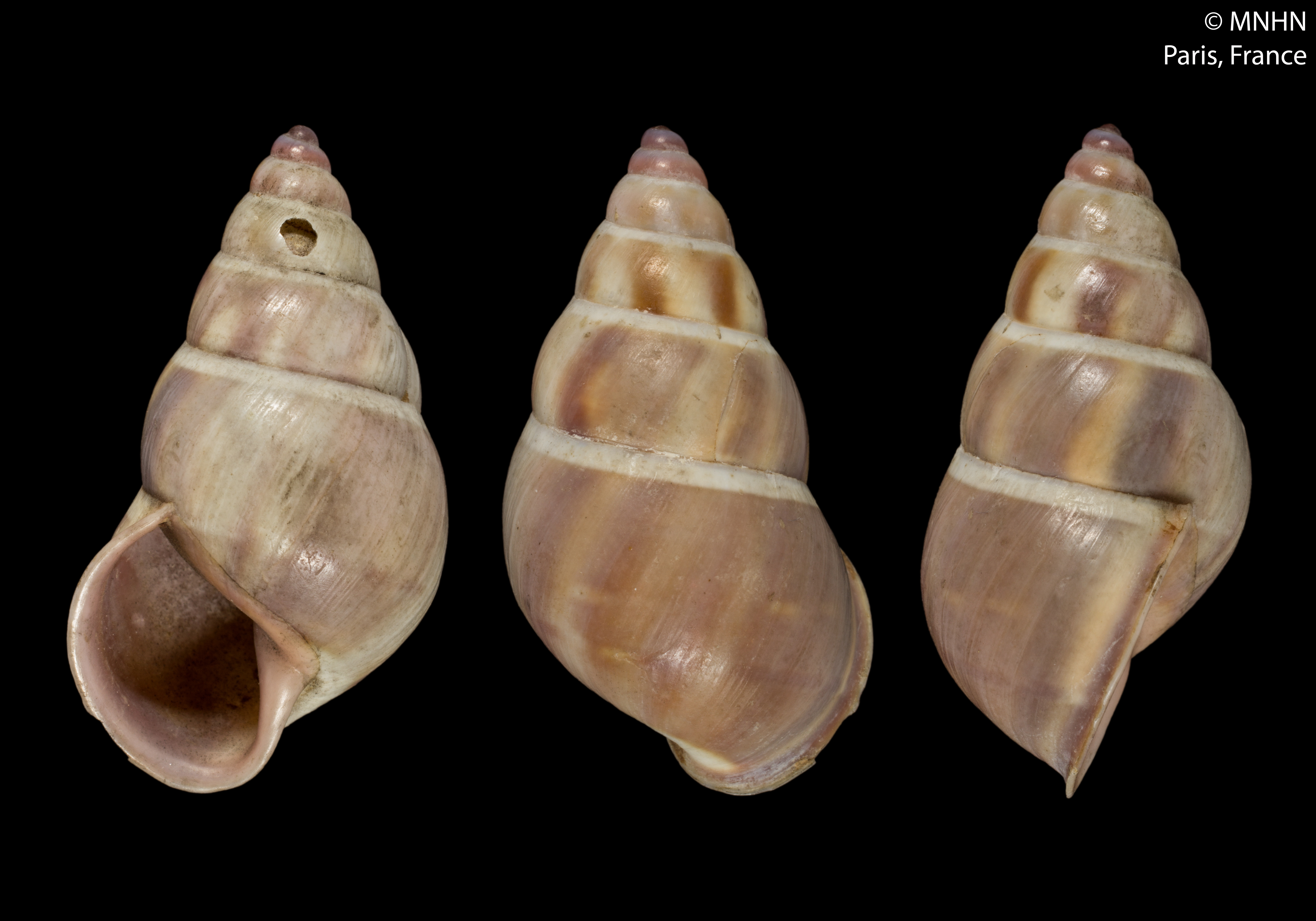
- Shell of Amphidromus perrieri (syntype at MNHN, Paris)

Scientific classification
- Domain: Eukaryota
- Kingdom: Animalia
- Phylum: Mollusca
- Class: Gastropoda
- Order: Stylommatophora
- Family: Camaenidae
- Genus: Amphidromus
- Species: A. perrieri

Binomial name
- Amphidromus perrieri Rochebrune, 1882

= Amphidromus perrieri =

Species of snail

Amphidromus perrieri is a species of air-breathing land snail, a terrestrial pulmonate gastropod mollusc in the family Camaenidae.

This is a taxon inquirendum, usage in recent literature is undocumented.

== Description ==
The length of the shell attains 38 mm, its diameter 14 mm.

Dr. Jousseaume compared a specimen of Amphidromus fasciatus with the type of A. perrieri for Mr. Fulton and stated that he could not separate them.

The sinistral shell is elongate-conic, very solid, and delicately striatulate. it is painted with spaced, wide, square spots arranged in two spiral series. The spire appears elongate, with a rather acute, reddish vertex. Comprising seven convex whorls, the shell features a deep, blue-zoned suture. The body whorl is elongate, measuring half the length of the shell, with the base displaying two wide violet-blue bands. The aperture is narrow and long, somewhat narrowed anteriorly; the peristome is white, inflexed, and somewhat calloused; and the columellar margin is straight.

The biserial arrangement of spots and white peristome do not agree well with the Thailand species; more information is needed.

== Distribution ==
This species was found in Cambodia.
