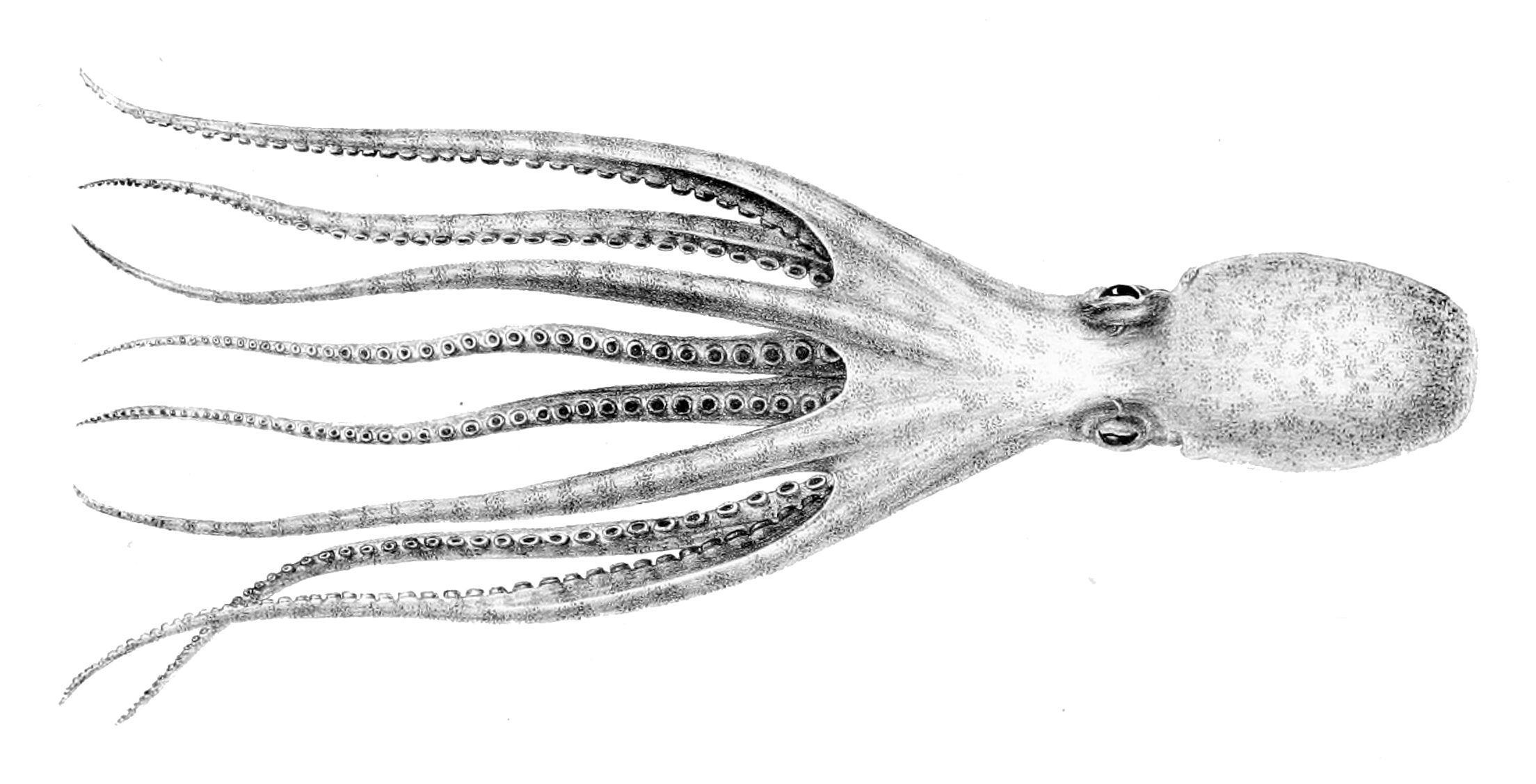
- Eledone cirrhosa

Scientific classification
- Kingdom: Animalia
- Phylum: Mollusca
- Class: Cephalopoda
- Order: Octopoda
- Family: Eledonidae; Leach, 1817
- Genus: Eledone (Leach, 1817)

Type species
- Octopus cirrhosus Lamarck, 1789

Species
- See text.

Synonyms
- Aphrodoctopus Roper & Mangold, 1991; Eledona Risso, 1854; Hoylea Rochebrune, 1885; Ozoena Rafinesque, 1814

= Eledone =

Genus of molluscs

Eledone is a genus of octopuses forming the only genus in the family Eledonidae. It is mainly distributed in the northern and southern Atlantic Ocean, with one species, E. palari, described from the southwestern Pacific Ocean and eastern Indian Ocean in waters around Indonesia and Australia and another, E. microsicya, from the western Indian Ocean. One species, E. thysanophora, is now regarded as a synonym of the brush-tipped octopus (Eledone schultzei).

== Species ==
The following species are currently classified as being in the genus Eledone:

- Eledone caparti Adam, 1950
- Eledone cirrhosa (Lamarck, 1798) – curled octopus
- Eledone gaucha Haimovici, 1988
- Eledone massyae Voss, 1964 – combed octopus
- Eledone microsicya * (Rochebrune, 1884)
- Eledone moschata (Lamarck, 1798) – musky octopus
- Eledone nigra (Hoyle, 1910)
- Eledone palari Lu and Stranks, 1992 – spongetip octopus
- Eledone schultzei Hoyle, 1910 -- brush-tipped octopus

The species listed above with an asterisk (*) are questionable and need further study to determine if they are valid species or synonyms.
