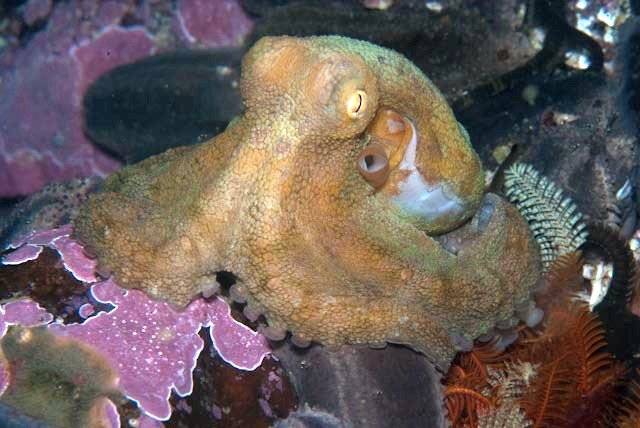

Conservation status
- Data Deficient (IUCN 3.1)

Scientific classification
- Kingdom: Animalia
- Phylum: Mollusca
- Class: Cephalopoda
- Order: Octopoda
- Family: Eledonidae
- Genus: Eledone
- Species: E. schultzei

Binomial name
- Eledone schultzei (Hoyle, 1910)

Synonyms
- Aphrodoctopus carlgreni (Thore, 1945); Aphrodoctopus nigra (Hoyle, 1910); Aphrodoctopus schultzei (Hoyle, 1910); Eledone carlgreni Thore, 1945; Eledone thysanophora Voss, 1962

= Eledone schultzei =

Brush-tipped octopus

Species of octopus

Eledone schultzei, the brush-tipped octopus, is a rare species of octopus. It has previously been known by other taxonomic names (synonyms) including Eledone thysanophora and Aphrodoctopus schultzei.

== Distribution ==
It is found off the South African coast from Saldanha Bay to Table Bay in less than 10m of water.

== Description ==
The brush-tipped octopus has a round body with eight arms and no shell. Its arms have one row of suckers. Brush-like digitate are found at the end of each of its arms, except for the hectocotylus.

== Ecology ==
Its habits are mostly unknown, but it feeds on small crustaceans.
