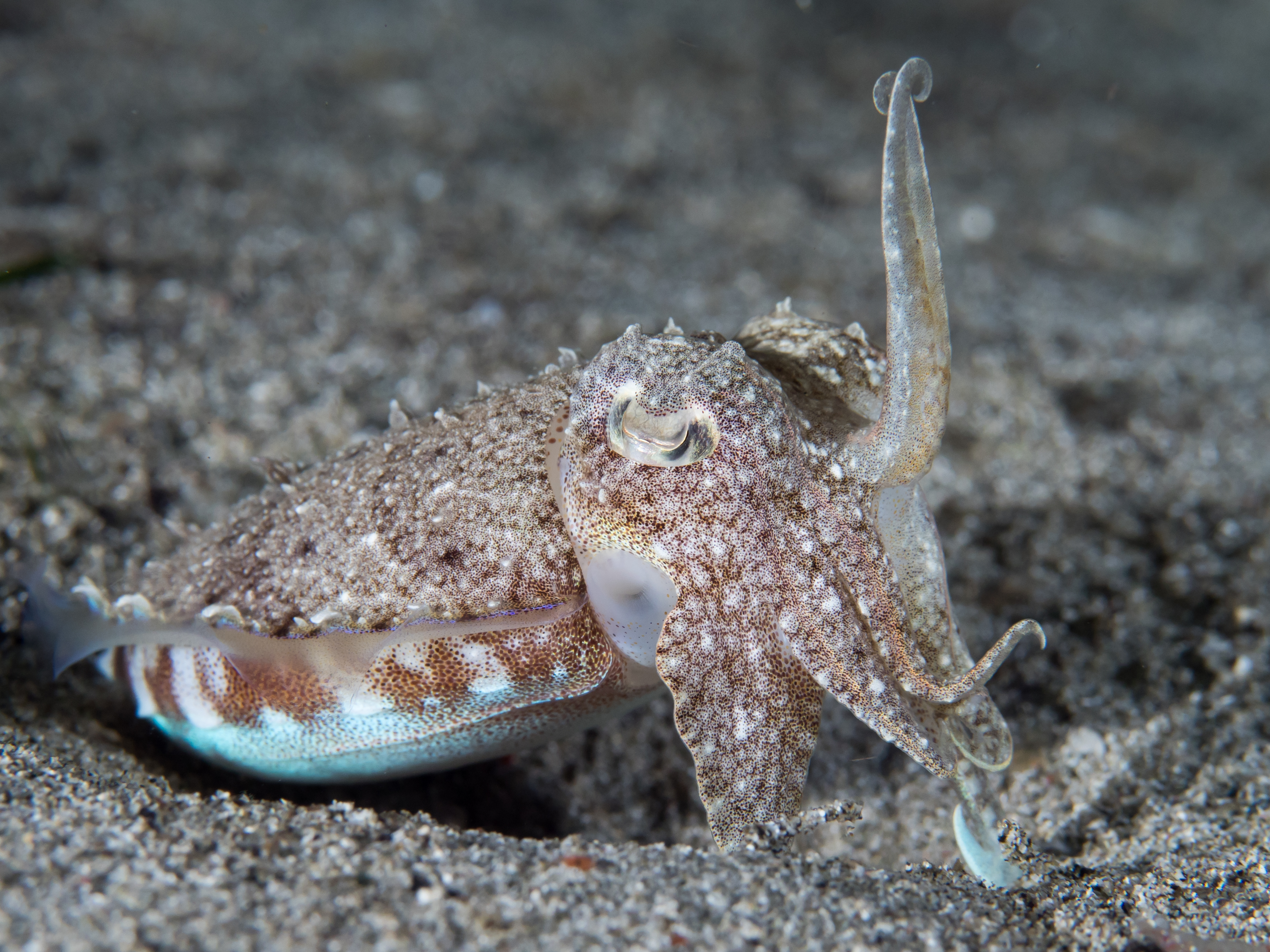

Conservation status
- Least Concern (IUCN 3.1)

Scientific classification
- Kingdom: Animalia
- Phylum: Mollusca
- Class: Cephalopoda
- Order: Sepiida
- Family: Sepiidae
- Genus: Acanthosepion
- Species: A. smithi

Binomial name
- Acanthosepion smithi (Hoyle, 1885)

Synonyms
- Sepia smithi Hoyle, 1885; Acanthosepion pageorum Iredale, 1954

= Acanthosepion smithi =

Species of cuttlefish

Acanthosepion smithi, also known as Smith's cuttlefish, is a widely distributed species of cuttlefish in the family Sepiidae. The species has been observed off the coast of Northern Australia.

== Description ==
The species is usually a varying shade of brown in color, and can have white "dots" on their exterior. The species has 3 pairs of arms, and both sexes have eye-spots.

== Taxonomy ==
Sepia smithi was first described by William Evans Hoyle in 1885. A 2023 phylogenetic analysis found Sepia smithi to be sister to Sepia elliptica. Both were found to belong to a larger clade of Indo-Pacific species, assigned by the authors to the reinstated genus Acanthosepion, previously synonymized with Sepia.
