= Eledone palari =

Spongetip octopus

Conservation status
- Least Concern (IUCN 3.1)

Scientific classification
- Kingdom: Animalia
- Phylum: Mollusca
- Class: Cephalopoda
- Order: Octopoda
- Family: Eledonidae
- Genus: Eledone
- Species: E. palari

Binomial name
- Eledone palari Lu & Stranks, 1992

Species of mollusc

Eledone palari, commonly known as the spongetip octopus, is a species of benthic octopus from the coastal waters of the eastern Indian Ocean and the south-western Pacific. The species was formally described in 1992 and is the first species of the genus Eledone to be discovered which is not distributed in the Atlantic Ocean.

== Description ==
The spongetip octopus has gelatinous skin with deeply webbed arms bearing a single row of suckers. The common English name refers to the spongy tips of the mature male's arms; these are thought to have some reproductive function. Like other members of the genus Eledone, this octopus has an ink sac and no fins on the mantle. The male reaches sexual maturity at a mantle length of around 30 mm, while females are sexually mature at a mantle length of 60 mm.

== Habitat and distribution ==
This is a benthic octopus which is found at depths of between 200 m and 600 m. It is distributed in the coastal waters of Australia and Indonesia.
