= Eledone gaucha =

Conservation status
- Data Deficient (IUCN 3.1)

Scientific classification
- Kingdom: Animalia
- Phylum: Mollusca
- Class: Cephalopoda
- Order: Octopoda
- Family: Eledonidae
- Genus: Eledone
- Species: E. gaucha

Binomial name
- Eledone gaucha Haimovici, 1988

Species of mollusc

Eledone gaucha is a species of octopus from the southern Atlantic Ocean. It is a predator of fish, crabs, lobsters and molluscs.

This octopus is a member of the genus Eledone and belongs to the family Eledonidae.

It was distinguished from a similar species, Eledone massyae. Eledone gaucha is smaller in size than E. massyae and has a smaller mantle and head.

== Description ==
Eledone gaucha possesses a firm, thin, ovoid and elongated mantle. It is separated from the head by a small constriction. The body is smooth and papillae can be found on the dorsal mantle and on the head. The head is narrower than the mantle and the eyes are protruding. The syphon is long, W-shaped and free from its front half. The arms are long and thin. The dorsal arms are notably longer than the other arms and the arms from the males are longer than those of the females. The suckers are small, well separated and deeply anchored in the arms. On the arms of females, suckers are regrouped on the tip of the arm. On the second half of the first right arm, the number of suckers vary between 17 and 23.

Males possess heteromorphic arms and some arms with hectocotyl that have modified papillae or suckers. One arm possesses an hectocotyl.

The color varies from brown to nearly white dorsally to nearly always white ventrally.

Females have a various size ranging from 14 to 55 mm and males range from 14 to 47 mm.

The main sources of food for E. gaucha are microcrustaceans such as Gammaridae or Caprellidae, of isopods and macro crustaceans such as decapods of the infraorders Brachyura and Anomura. The species can also feed on polychaetes, bony fish and mollusks.

== Distribution ==
Eledone gaucha is found along the coasts of Southern Brazil, between Cavo Frio and Chui. For now, it has never been found further south than the coasts of Brazil.

== Habitat ==
Eledone gaucha is found at moderate depth on muddy or sandy soils. During the reproductive period, individuals move to rocky soils overlooking gentle slopes. This habitat is common with Eledone massyae.

== Reproduction ==
Females become sexually mature when they are older and taller than males. They can reproduce when they are not fully mature and store sperm at the apex of ovary filaments. No seasonality in mating could be observed. It is also assumed that cohorts of individuals overlap during the year, each with a reproductive cycle estimated to be sub-annual.
