= Eledone microsicya =

Scientific classification
- Kingdom: Animalia
- Phylum: Mollusca
- Class: Cephalopoda
- Order: Octopoda
- Family: Eledonidae
- Genus: Eledone
- Species: E. microsicya

Binomial name
- Eledone microsicya Rochebrune, 1884

Synonyms
- Eledonenta microsicya Rochebrune, 1884

Species of mollusc

Eledone microsicya is a little-known species of octopus from the western Indian Ocean. There is a view that because of the similarity in the skins of the single specimen of E. microsicya to the Musky Octopus Eledone moschata that this is not a valid taxon and represents a Red Sea population of the otherwise Mediteraranean E. moschata.
