= Eledone caparti =

Conservation status
- Data Deficient (IUCN 3.1)

Scientific classification
- Kingdom: Animalia
- Phylum: Mollusca
- Class: Cephalopoda
- Order: Octopoda
- Family: Eledonidae
- Genus: Eledone
- Species: E. caparti

Binomial name
- Eledone caparti Adam 1950

Species of mollusc

Eledone caparti is a rare and little known species of benthic octopus from the Atlantic Ocean off the south-west coast of Africa. The egg masses of Eledone caparti have been found in the dissected stomachs of blue sharks.
