= Eledone massyae =

Combed octopus

Conservation status
- Least Concern (IUCN 3.1)

Scientific classification
- Kingdom: Animalia
- Phylum: Mollusca
- Class: Cephalopoda
- Order: Octopoda
- Family: Eledonidae
- Genus: Eledone
- Species: E. massyae

Binomial name
- Eledone massyae Voss, 1964

Species of mollusc

Eledone massyae, the combed octopus, is a small benthic octopus found off the Atlantic coasts of southern South America, particularly Argentina and southern Brazil.

== Description ==
The body is rounded and slightly flattened dorso-ventrally. The head is narrower than the mantle and separated by a slight constriction. The opening in the mantle is very large and the arms are the same length. The suckers are small, separated from one another and deeply anchored in the arm. The third arm possesses a hectocotylus in the male individuals. Also in males, other arms have suckers that decrease in number until the tip of the arm. After the last sucker are two ranges of papillae that diverge on the sides. On female individuals, the arms are not modified.

Females have a variable size ranging from 24 to 91 mm and males vary between 22 and 80 mm.

Eledone massyae feeds mostly on macro crustaceans such as crabs from the family Portunidae as well as polychaetes and molluscs.

== Distribution ==
Eledone massyae is found seasonally along the continental shelf of Rio de Janeiro. Its distribution ranges from Rio de Janeiro to the Peninsula Valdez in Argentina.

== Habitat and ecology ==
It lives in sandy and muddy areas of the middle and outer continental shelf of the southwestern Atlantic Ocean between 30° and 34°S, mainly in waters off Argentina and southern Brazil. In these areas it appears to be sympatric with a scarcer cogener, Eledone gaucha.

The species is found on the bottom of slopes. During spring and summer, it is found in cold waters of maximum 18 degrees Celsius and around 60 meters deep. In autumn, it is found rather close to continental shelves with a maximum temperature of 21 degrees Celsius while in winter, it is found close to continental shelves with subantarctic cold water influences.

== Reproduction ==
The lifespan of E. massyae is approximately around two years. Females die after a single spawning that takes place in autumn around November. The eggs hatch around March. It is supposed that they are attached to a solid substrate such as rocks. Juveniles appear in summer on the continental shelf where they grow and reach sexual maturity in spring or summer of their second year.

Like other species of Eledone, female Eledone massyae are able to store sperm when they are not sexually mature in order to use it when they reach sexual maturity. The sperm could be stored for three months between copulation and spawning.

The process of maturation of E. massyae is different regarding each sex. Females become sexually mature when the ovary enlarges as a result of yolk production. This enlargement occurs late in the life of the individual. In males, the process of sexual maturation is complex and begins early in the individual's life. It is strongly correlated with body size.
