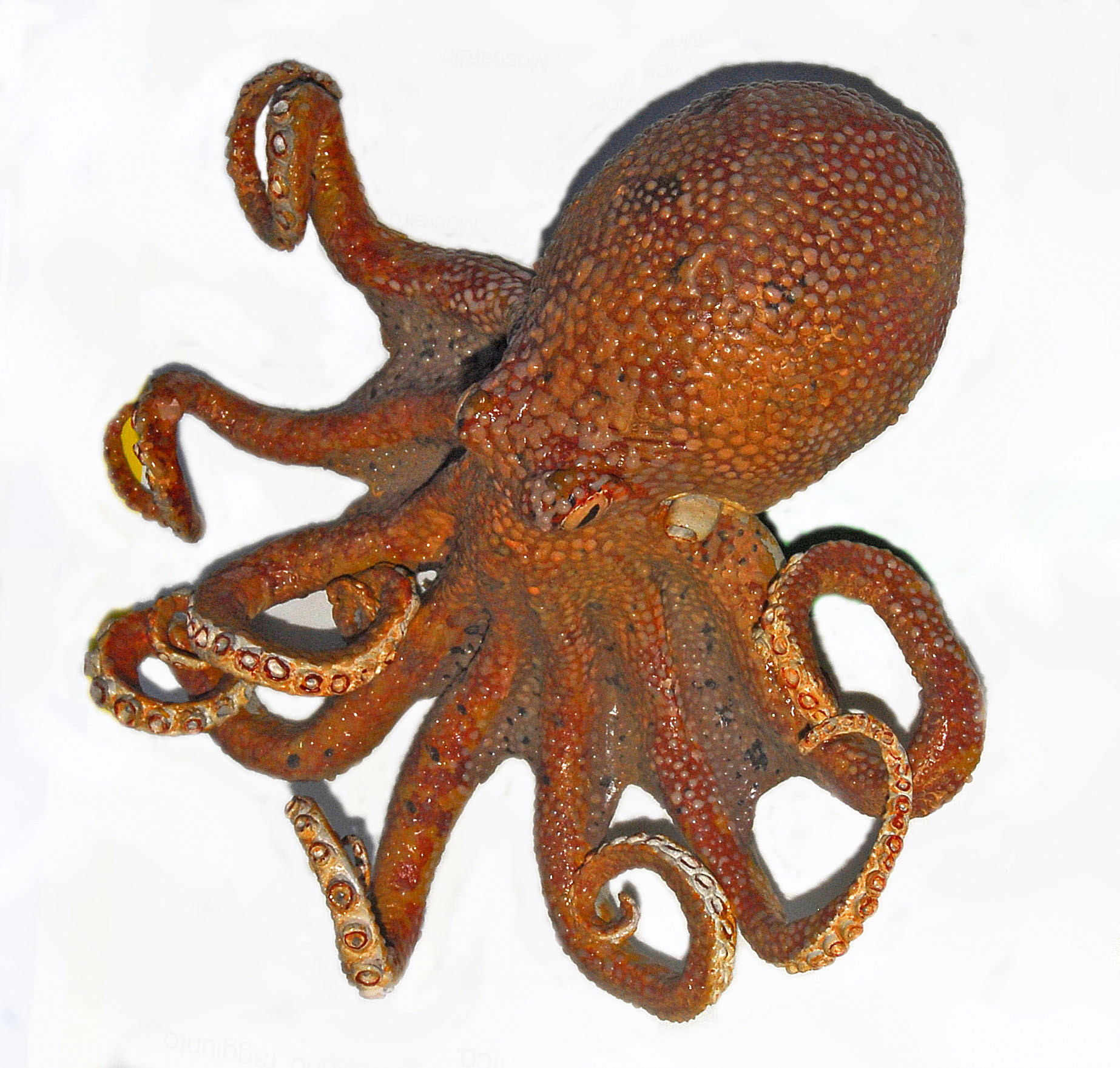
- Museum model of Eledone moschata

Conservation status
- Least Concern (IUCN 3.1)

Scientific classification
- Kingdom: Animalia
- Phylum: Mollusca
- Class: Cephalopoda
- Order: Octopoda
- Family: Eledonidae
- Genus: Eledone
- Species: E. moschata

Binomial name
- Eledone moschata (Lamarck, 1798)

Synonyms
- Octopus moschatus Lamarck, 1798; Octopus moschites Carus, 1824; Ozoena moschata (Lamarck, 1798); Eledona moschata (Lamarck, 1798); Moschites moschatus (Lamarck, 1798)

= Eledone moschata =

Musky octopus

Species of cephalopods

Eledone moschata, the musky octopus, is a species of octopus belonging to the family Eledonidae.

== Taxonomy ==
The skin of the single specimen of Eledone microsicya is very similar to the skin of Eledone moschata and some authorities take the view that E. microsicya is not a valid taxon and represents a Red Sea population of the otherwise Mediteraranean E. moschata with which it should synonymised.

== Distribution ==
The musky octopus is found throughout the Mediterranean Sea, and is occasionally found in adjacent parts of the Atlantic Ocean, around the Gulf of Cadiz and off the coast of Portugal.

== Habitat ==
The musky octopus occurs on the sandy bottom of the continental platform, at depths up to 400 m (1,300 ft; 220 fathoms). Usually it lives burrowed into the sediments.

== Description ==
The largest recorded musky octopus was a male with a mantle length of 188 mm (7 3/8 in), a total length of 740 mm (29 in) and a mass of 1,414 grams (3 1/10 lb), caught in the Gulf of İzmir (Gulf of Smyrna), in the Aegean Sea. This small species has a head smaller than the body, with protruding eyes. The eight arms are relatively short and have one row of suckers. The third right arm (called Hectocotylus) is specialized to store and transfer spermatophores to the female. The basic color of the body is gray-brown, with dark, brown to blackish spots.

Eledone moschata is closely related to the horned octopus, Eledone cirrhosa, but can be distinguished by a number of features; for example, E. moschata has smooth skin and smells of musk, while E. cirrhosa has warty skin and no musky odour.

== Ecology ==
The musky octopus feeds on a wide variety of crustaceans, molluscs and fish. Crustaceans are preferred, and species known to be eaten by E. moschata include Maja squinado, Maja crispata, Macropodia rostrata, Macropodia longirostris, Pisa tetraodon, Dorippe lanata, Lissa chiragra, Lambrus angulifrons, Lambrus massena, Inachus dorsettensis, Carcinus aestuarii, Pachygrapsus marmoratus, Xantho poressa, Pilumnus hirtellus, Goneplax rhomboides, Pagurus prideaux, Ilia nucleus and Squilla mantis; molluscs consumed by E., moschata include Chlamys varia, Mytilus galloprovincialis, Sepia orbignyana, Illex coindetii, Loligo subulata; E. moschata also eats the fish Engraulis encrasicolus, Sardina pilchardus, Mullus barbatus, Diplodus annularis, Merluccius merluccius, Merlangius merlangus, Lepidotrigla cavillone, Trachurus trachurus and Trisopterus minutus.

== Gallery ==
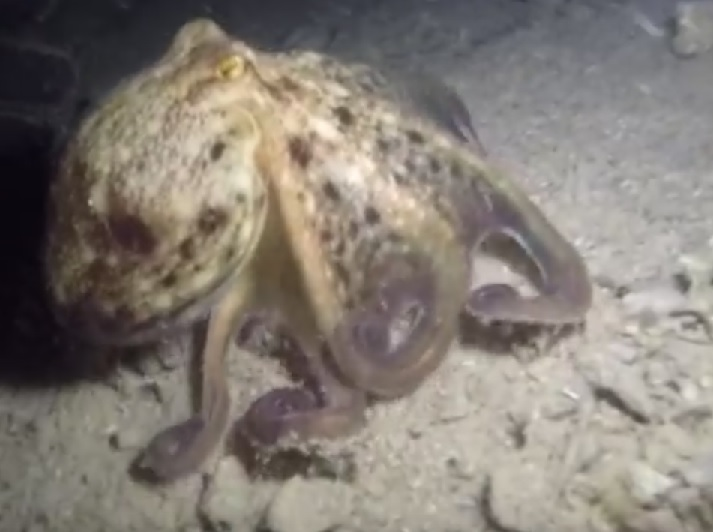
A live individual of Eledone moschata

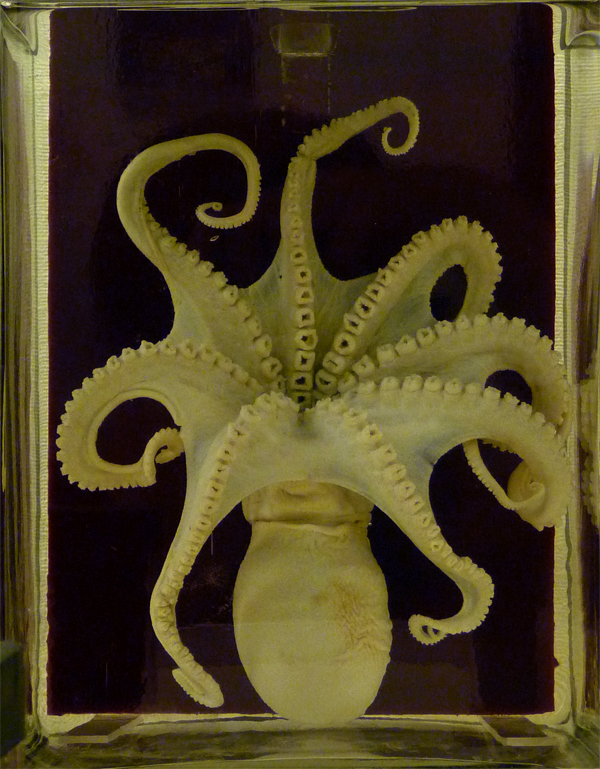
Illustration

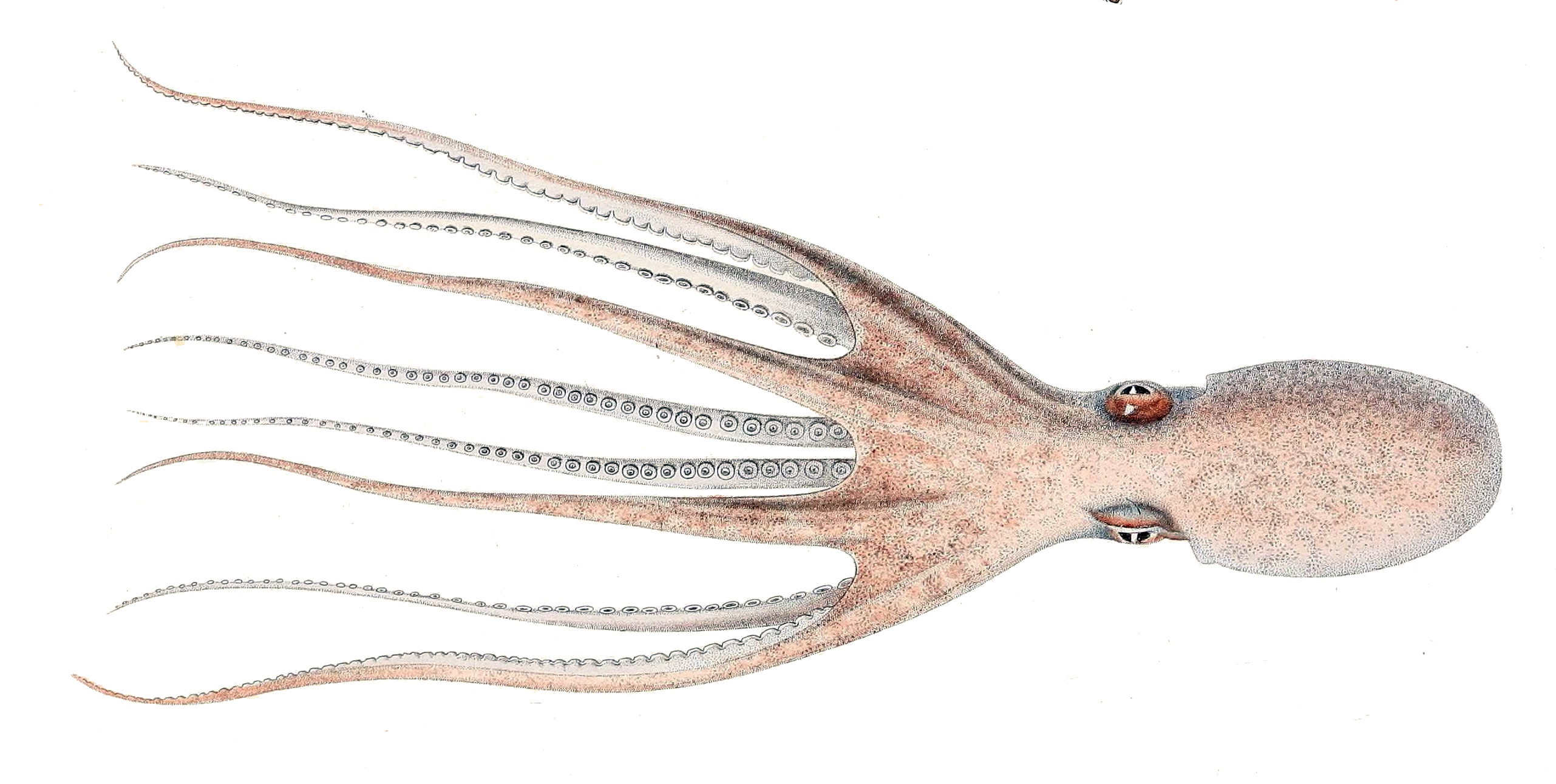
Illustration (1845)

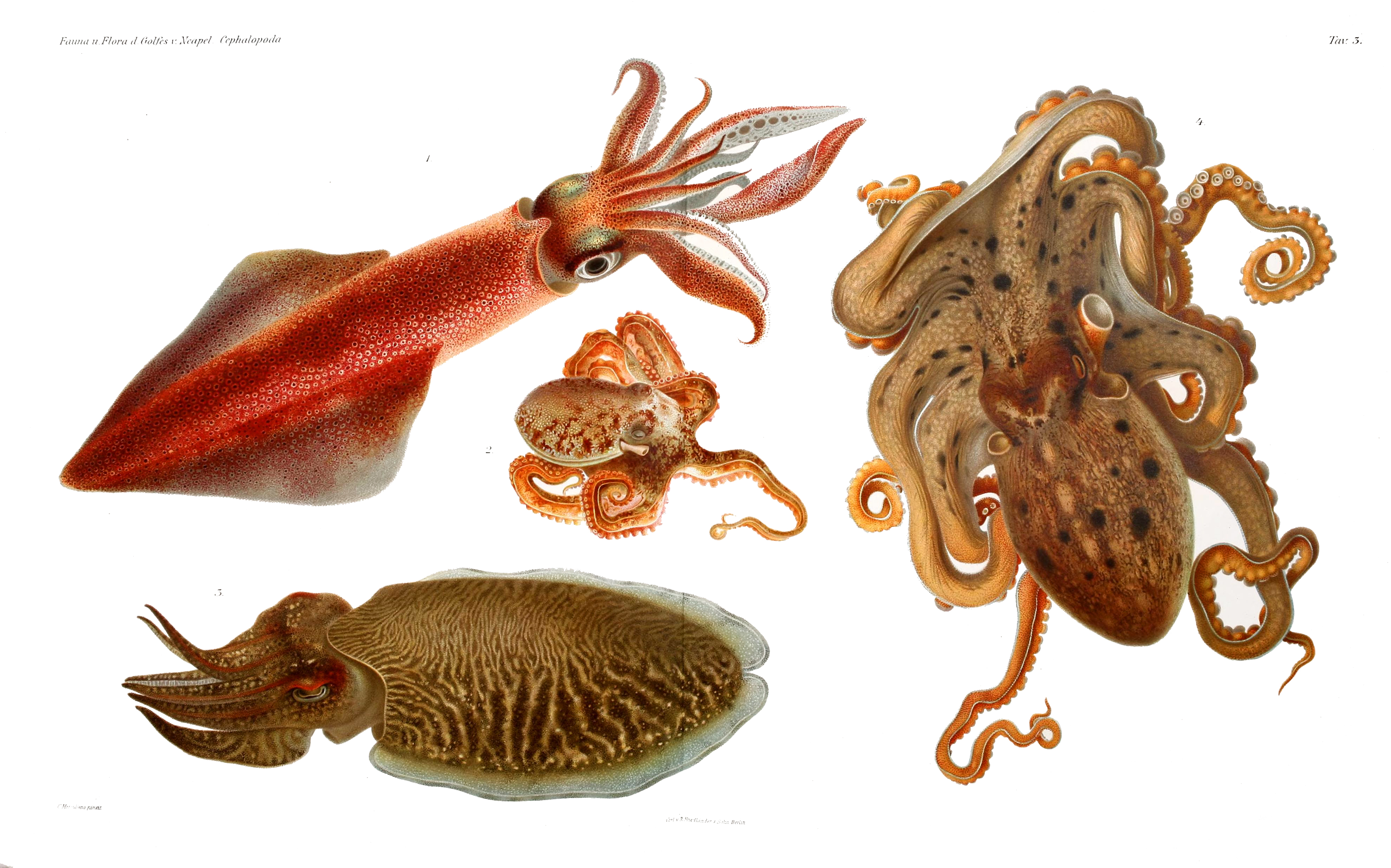
Illustration (1896)
