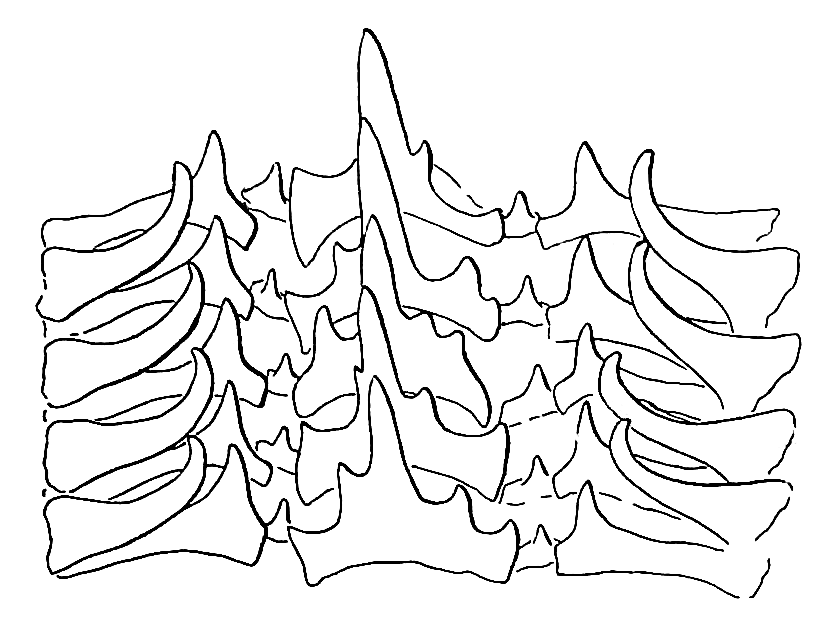
- Radula of Eledone nigra

Scientific classification
- Kingdom: Animalia
- Phylum: Mollusca
- Class: Cephalopoda
- Order: Octopoda
- Family: Eledonidae
- Genus: Eledone
- Species: E. nigra

Binomial name
- Eledone nigra (Hoyle, 1910)

Synonyms
- Moschites nigra Hoyle 1910

= Eledone nigra =

Species of mollusc

Eledone nigra is a little-known species of octopus described from one male and six females which were taken in Luderitz Bay, Namibia and has only been recorded subsequently in 1941, 1983 and 1991, all from Luderitz Bay.
