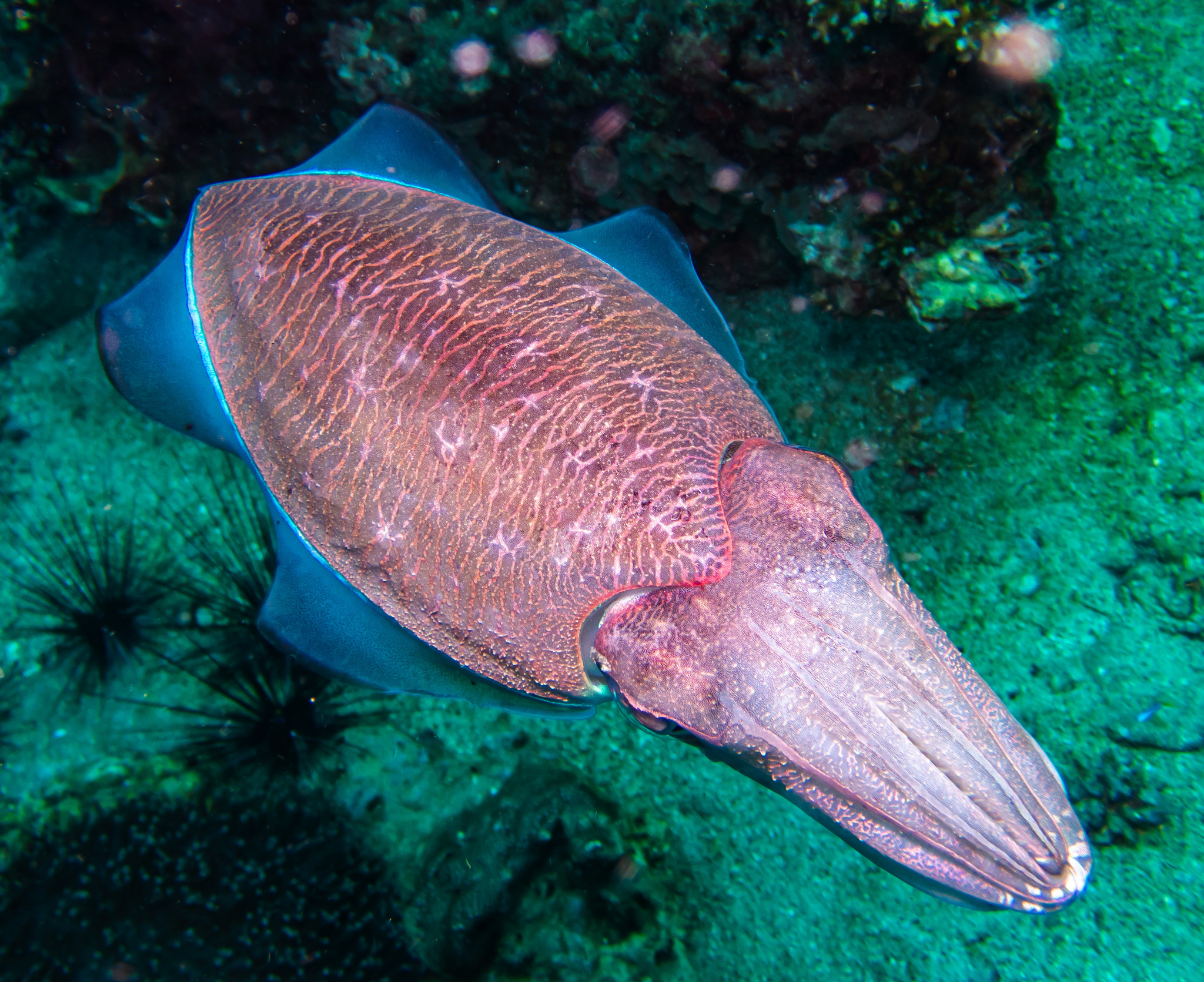

Conservation status
- Data Deficient (IUCN 3.1)

Scientific classification
- Kingdom: Animalia
- Phylum: Mollusca
- Class: Cephalopoda
- Order: Sepiida
- Family: Sepiidae
- Genus: Acanthosepion
- Species: A. pharaonis

Binomial name
- Acanthosepion pharaonis Ehrenberg, 1831
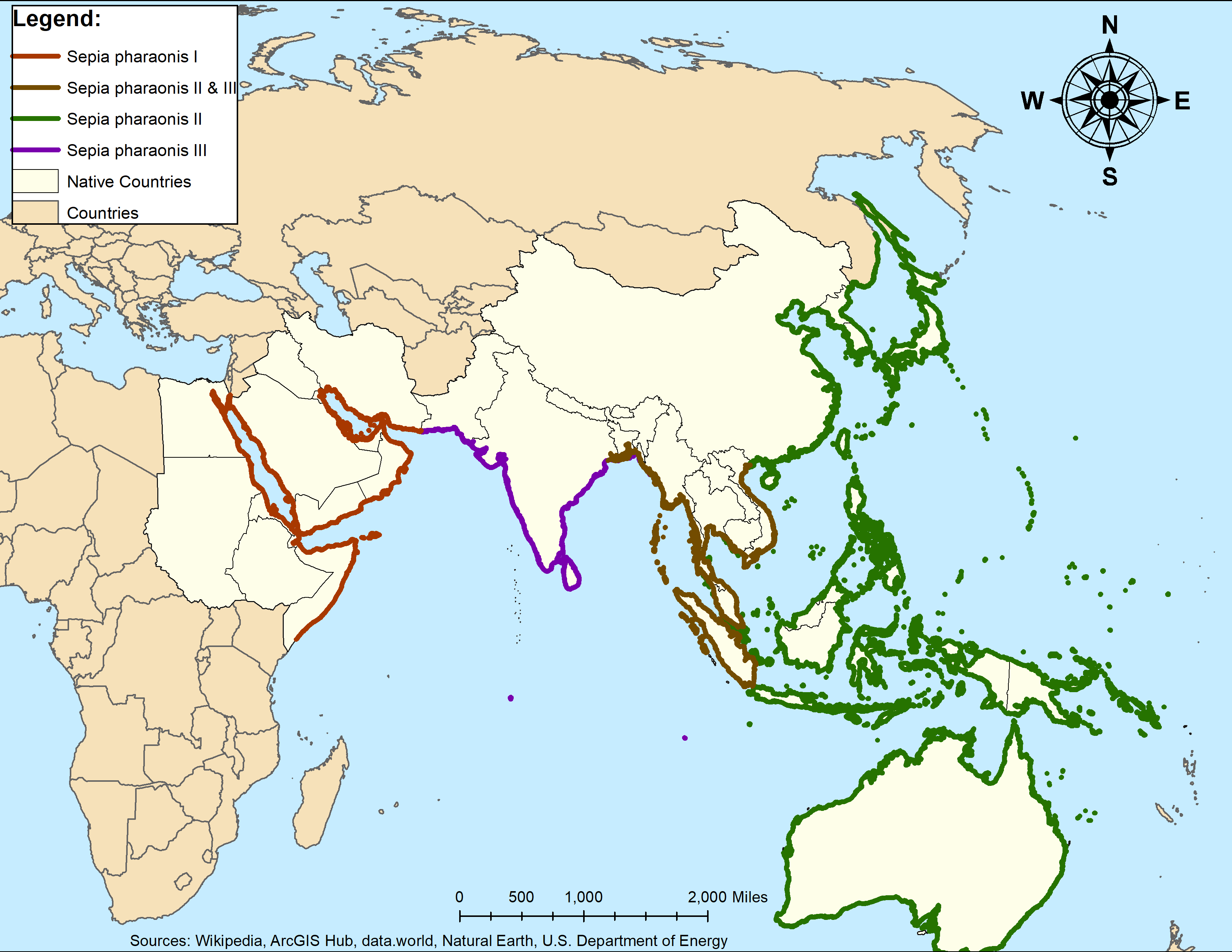
- Range of the A. pharaonis cuttlefish

Synonyms
- List: Sepia pharaonis Ehrenberg, 1831; Sepia rouxi Orbigny, 1841; Sepia formosana Berry, 1912; Sepia formosana Sasaki, 1929; Sepia tigris Sasaki, 1929; Sepia torosa Ortmann, 1888; Crumenasepia hulliana Iredale, 1926; Crumenasepia ursulae Cotton, 1929

= Pharaoh cuttlefish =

Species of cephalopods

The pharaoh cuttlefish (Acanthosepion pharaonis) is a large cuttlefish species, growing to 42 cm in mantle length and 5 kg in weight.

Acanthosepion pharaonis is likely a complex of at least three species, Acanthosepion pharaonis I, commonly located in the Red Sea and Persian Gulf, A. pharaonis II, located from Japan to the Gulf of Thailand and northern Australia; and A. pharaonis III, located from the Indian Ocean to the Andaman Sea.

The type specimen was collected in the Gulf of Suez and is deposited at the Museum für Naturkunde in Berlin.

== Description ==
Pharaoh cuttlefish often show a solid colour when resting on a solid colour background, alternating from a pale white to all dark brown. Additionally, they can show a mottled white and brown colour, with a centre circle of brown. The mechanism for colour in the Pharaoh cuttlefish is about the same as it is in other cuttlefish. This colour-changing function is produced by groups of red, yellow, brown, and black pigmented chromatophores above a layer of reflective blue and green tinted iridophores and leucophores, with up to 200 of these specialized pigment cells per square millimeter. These sacs of colour are controlled by rings of muscle around the sac. The cuttlefish expands and contracts these muscle rings in order to show different colours.

== Range and habitat ==
The pharaoh cuttlefish is native to at least the western Indian Ocean, including the Red Sea and Persian Gulf. Of all the cuttlefish species in the Persian Gulf, it is the most commonly caught. When hunting at night, it swims up to shallower parts of the sea to feast on a variety of smaller fish, crabs, and occasionally other cuttlefish. It is thought to have reached the Mediterranean Sea as a Lessepsian migrant via the Suez Canal after many of its cuttlebones were washed up on beaches in Israel in the early 2000s.

They have been observed to exhibit migratory behaviour off the south-west coast of India. They are more commonly found furthest north during August, and further south in May. They show an even distribution in October and February. Additionally, there are more juveniles present in May, and more adults present in August.

The Pharaoh cuttlefish prefer a medium to high amount of sunlight for den location during the day. Additionally, they prefer mud substrata during the day, and either sand or mud substrata during the night.

== Biology ==
Similar to other cuttlefish, pharaoh cuttlefish use their chromatophores for camouflage and other cryptic behaviors. They have many types of body patterns, including uniform, mottled, or disruptive. While they have no preference in using any of them, the use of each pattern depends on the surrounding environment as well as predators and prey within the area, and they may even produce a mixed type of body pattern depending on the substrate around them. Depending on the richness of the environment around them, juvenile cuttlefish have exhibited a clear response to colour changing and cryptic behavior early on when in sandy loose ocean floors with surrounding objects. Physical enrichment allows the cuttlefish to better explore and learn its surroundings in order to correctly display the colouring and camouflage needed for survival.

In addition to colour mimicry, cuttlefish and other cephalopods have shown instances of imitating other species, whether for scaring off predators or luring in prey. The pharaoh cuttlefish in particular has been witnessed exhibiting an arm flapping behaviour where their first pair of arms are raised and wrinkled at the distal end, with the second and third arm pairs bent and flapped at the distal ends as well. While mostly observed during hunting and believed to be a sort of lure by mimicry of hermit crabs to get closer to prey, as hermit crabs are bottom feeders, the cause of the unique flapping display will need to be further verified.

=== Feeding ecology ===
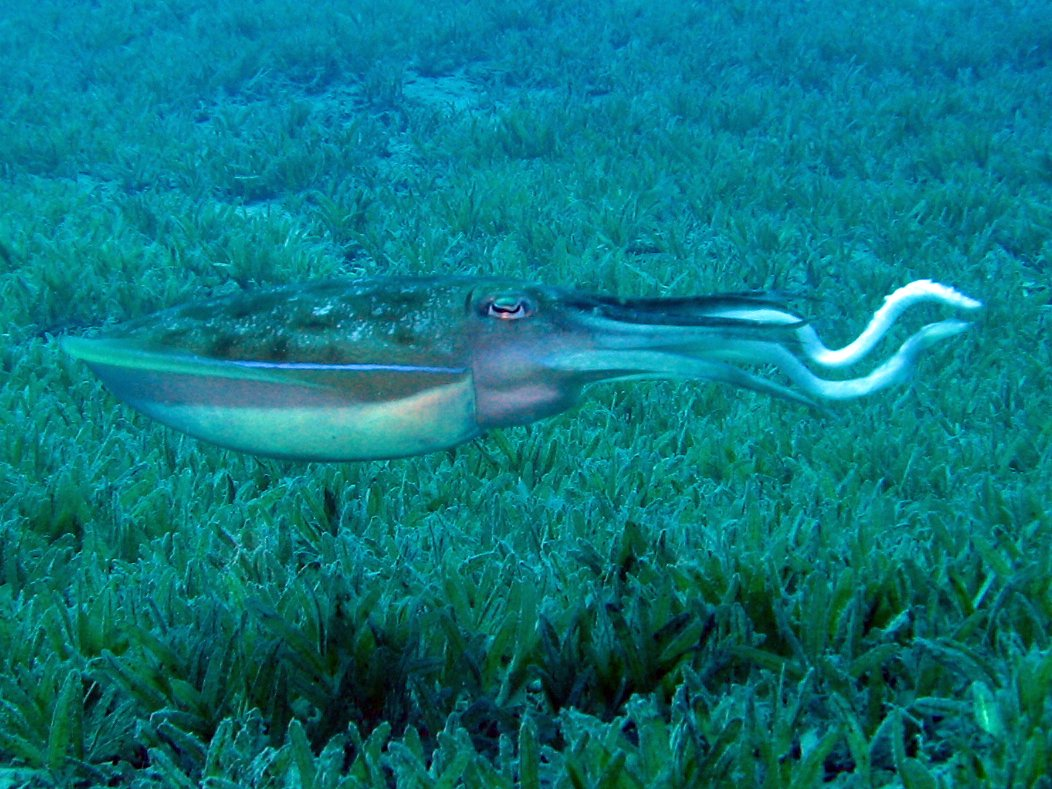
Acanthosepion pharaonis with its feeding tentacles extended, Egypt

Most cephalopods use their two elongated tentacles for prey hunting, and particularly cuttlefish are known to use a three-step process of attention, positioning, and seizure. Adult pharaoh cuttlefish and most juveniles begin their attention stance with throwing their arms and tentacles into a triangle shape, turning to the prey. This is followed by a positioning stage where the tentacles are moved slowly from the centre of the triangle as they move towards their prey. They finish this with their seizure phase, where they move forward until lunging their tentacles rapidly to grasp their prey before retracting the prey back towards them. Due to their small squat body size and lack of speed in forward propulsion, Acanthosepion pharaonis have adapted to use this ambush style of tentacle lunging.

=== Reproduction ===
Pharaoh cuttlefish reproduce similarly to most other cuttlefish. Large males compete with each other through combat until a victor is decided, although it is often decided without any initiation of physical combat. The males circle each other, performing threatening displays of colour and tentacles until one male swims off in defeat. The victorious male then mates with females by grabbing them with their tentacles, turning the female so that the two animals are face-to-face, then using a specialized tentacle to insert sperm sacs into an opening near the female's mouth. The male then guards the female until she lays the fertilised eggs a few hours later. Females undergo a series of phases when laying their eggs, beginning with a temporary posture where their arms are bunched in a fist-like position. They follow this with extending their arms forward and venting onto the spawning ground and eggs via their funnels, before extending their arms to deposit the laid eggs onto the proper substrata.

== Human uses ==
The pharaoh cuttlefish is a commonly fished species of cuttlefish in the Philippines, as well as the most economically important cuttlefish in the northern Indian Ocean. It is often eaten by humans in these areas. Typically, cuttlefish is consumed as dried, shredded cuttlefish, a popular snack food. In the Qing Dynasty-era manual of Chinese gastronomy, the Suiyuan shidan, the roe of the cuttlefish is considered a difficult to prepare but sought-after delicacy. This species is also being harvested by fishermen as a commercial species in the Suez Canal, Egypt.

Cuttlefish ink was used as a dye called sepia, an important pigment which has now been mostly supplanted by artificial dyes.

== See also ==
- Cephalopod size
- Common cuttlefish
- Chromatophore
