= Acanthosepion stelliferum =

Conservation status
- Data Deficient (IUCN 3.1)'

Scientific classification
- Kingdom: Animalia
- Phylum: Mollusca
- Class: Cephalopoda
- Order: Sepiida
- Family: Sepiidae
- Genus: Sepia
- Subgenus: Acanthosepion
- Species: S. stellifera

Binomial name
- Sepia stellifera Homenko and Khromov, 1984

Species of cuttlefish

Sepia stellifera is a species of cuttlefish native to the Indian Ocean. The mantle length of males is 140 mm, and 150 mm in females. It lives at depths of 34 to 95 m.
