= Alphonse Trémeau de Rochebrune =

French botanist, malacologist and zoologist

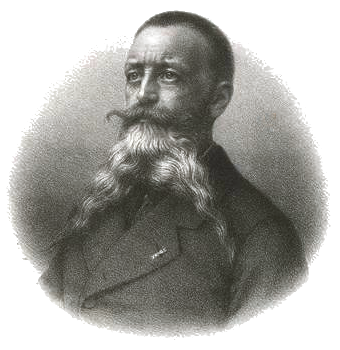
- Born: 18 September 1836; Saint Savin
- Died: 23 April 1912 (aged 75); Paris
- Citizenship: French
- Scientific career
- Fields: botanist, malacologist, zoologist
- Workplaces: Muséum national d'histoire naturelle
- Author abbrev. (botany): Rochebr.
- Author abbrev. (zoology): Rochebrune

Alphonse Amédée Trémeau de Rochebrune was a French botanist, malacologist and a zoologist. He was born on 18 September 1836 in Saint-Savin, and died on 23 April 1912 in Paris.

== Biography ==
The son of a curator of the Museum of Angoulême, he became a military surgeon and reached the rank of adjutant in 1870. After obtaining his doctorate in 1874, he travelled to Saint-Louis in Senegal.

In 1878, he joined the Muséum national d'histoire naturelle as an assistant in the Laboratory of Anthropology, and then replaced Victor Bertin (1849–1880), as assistant naturalist in the Laboratory of molluscs, worms and zoophytes, after Bertin's death. He held this post until his retirement in 1911. He addressed, in one hundred fifty publications, to a variety of subjects: from geology to paleontology, botany to malacology. These include his 1860 catalogue of wild flowering plants in the Department of Charente, co-written with Savatier Alexander.

From 1882 to 1883, Rochebrune took part in a scientific expedition to the Southern Ocean and Cape Horn, with the malacologist Jules François Mabille, during which they collected, and later described many new species of molluscs. In 1889, Rochebrune published reports on his extensive research. Much of Rochebrune's subsequent research was on the growth of shellfish.

Rochebrune was also the discoverer of a lamp from the Paleolithic era, in the caves of La Chaire a Calvin in Charente.

== Taxa named ==
The following taxa, currently considered to be valid, were named by Rochebrune.

- Eledone microsicya (Rochebrune, 1884)
- Leachia (Pyrgopsis) (Rochebrune, 1884)
- Leachia rynchophorus (Rochebrune, 1884)
- Sepia (Acanthosepion) (Rochebrune, 1884)
- Sepia (Doratosepion)(Rochebrune, 1884)
- Sepia (Rhombosepion) (Rochebrune, 1884)
- Sepia trygonina (Rochebrune, 1884)
- Pleurobranchus digueti Rochebrune, 1895

== Taxon described by him ==
- See Category:Taxa named by Alphonse Trémeau de Rochebrune
