= Gretta Pecl =

Australian marine ecologist and researcher

Gretta T. Pecl AM
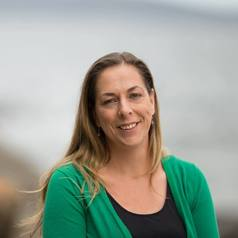
- Born: Tasmania
- Education: James Cook University (BS, PhD)
- Scientific career
- Fields: Marine ecology
- Workplaces: University of Tasmania; University of Alaska Southeast
- Thesis: Comparative life history of tropical and temperate Sepioteuthissquids in Australian waters
- Website: www.utas.edu.au/profiles/staff/imas/Gretta-Pecl

Gretta Tatyana Pecl AM is an Australian marine ecologist, Australian Research Council Future Fellow, and the Director of the Centre for Marine Socioecology (CMS) at the University of Tasmania. Her work focuses on species and ecosystem responses to climate change, as well as using socioecological approaches to adapt natural resource management for climate change. She is on the editorial board of Springer Nature's Reviews in Fish Biology and Fisheries, and is a Subject Editor for Ecography.

== Early life and education ==
Pecl is from Tasmania. She earned her bachelor's degree at James Cook University in 1994, completing an undergraduate dissertation on the muscle structure and dynamics of Idiosepius pygmaeus. Pecl remained at James Cook University for her doctoral studies, earning a PhD in 2000. Her doctoral thesis compared the life-history variation of two closely related cephalopod species, Sepioteuthis australis and Sepioteuthis lessoniana, on the east coast of Australia. Her research continued into a Fisheries Research and Development Corporation and Australian Research Council postdoctoral fellowship at the University of Tasmania, looking at the movement of Sepioteuthis australis using acoustic location and trace element analysis.

== Research and career ==
Pecl studies the ecology of climate change, in particular, what happens to wildlife in warming oceans. She has primarily investigated the warming waters off the coast of Tasmania. In 2009, Pecl founded the Range Extension Database and Mapping project (Redmap), a crowdsourced map which collects public sightings of fish, after attending a workshop and listening to fishers share information about recent sightings. The project uses a team of scientists to verify submitted photographs, and can make people more aware of climate change as they notice repeated changes in their own environments. Redmap was awarded the Royal Zoological Society of New South Wales Whitely Award in 2010.

In 2009, Pecl was awarded a Fulbright Program scholarship to join the University of Alaska-Fairbanks and study how climate change had impacted the red king crab. The next year she was named one of the University of Tasmania's "Rising Stars". She has formed an International Global Marine Hotspots Network (GMHN) with colleagues to bring users and managers of the sea together. In 2015, Pecl was awarded an Australian Research Council Future Fellowship to study the physiological and ecological mechanisms that underpin the redistribution of species through marine systems. In 2017, Pecl studied how the redistribution of land and fresh water species due to climate change affects human health, wellbeing, and culture. These impacts include tourism, recreational fishing, and health threats such as malaria. She served as editor-in-chief of Reviews in Fish Biology and Fisheries from 2014 to 2019 and an associate editor for Citizen Science: Theory and Practice from 2016 to 2020. She was elected to the Australian Society for Fish Biology Hall of Fame in 2016.

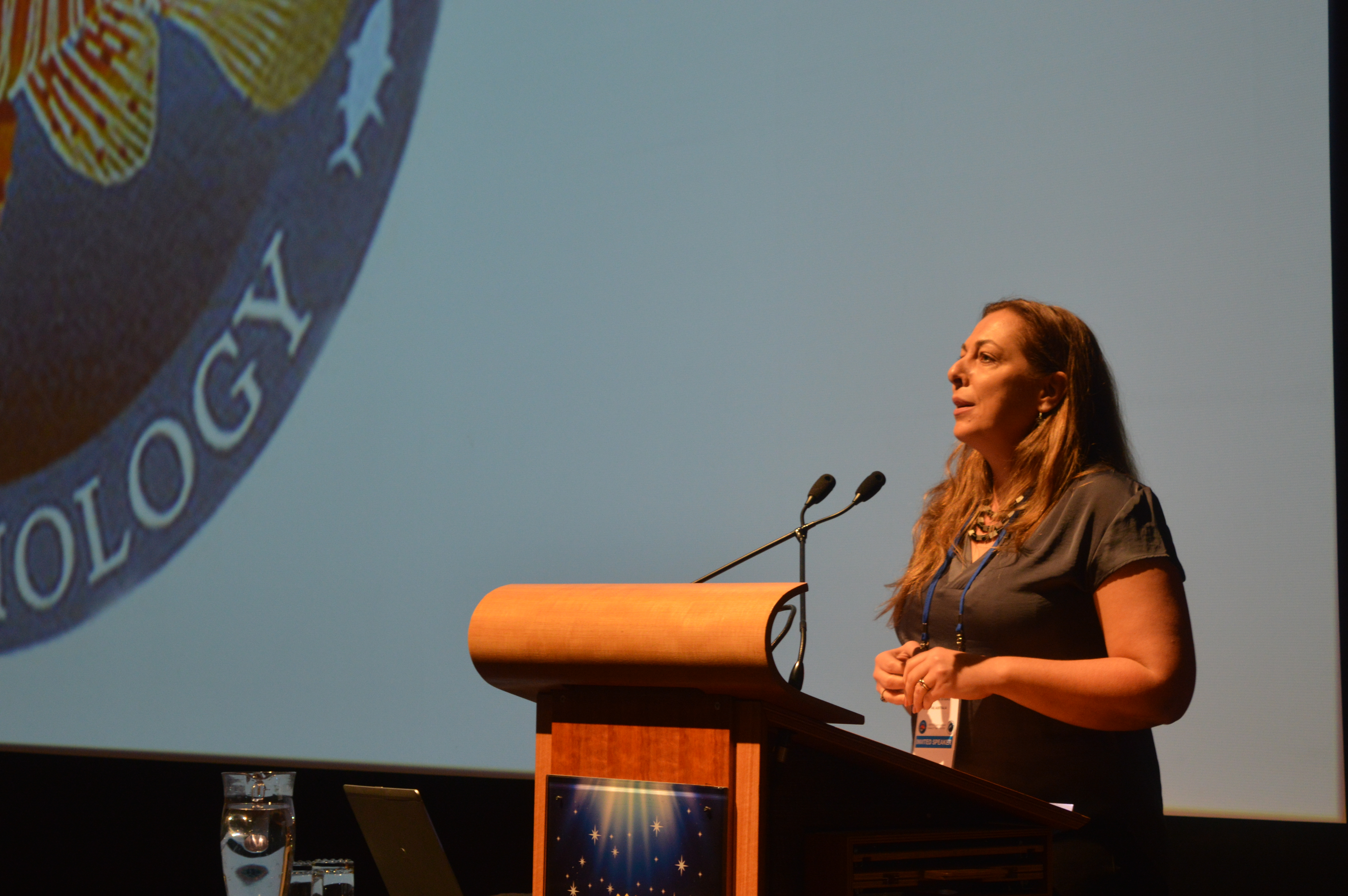
Pecl presents at a scientific conference in Hobart, Tasmania, in 2016.

Pecl became the Director of the Centre for Marine Socioecology at the University of Tasmania in 2018. The Centre is an interdisciplinary collaboration between the University of Tasmania, the CSIRO and the Australian Antarctic Division which aims to understand the interactions between the ecological and social aspects of marine conservation and management. In 2021 she created the Future Seas initiative, which aims to encourage interdisciplinary scientific collaboration to improve society's capacity to manage ocean systems as part of the United Nations' Decade of Ocean Science for Sustainable Development.

Pecl was a lead author for the Intergovernmental Panel on Climate Change's Sixth Assessment Report, responsible for the "Great Barrier Reef", "Oceans", "Tourism", "Marine food" and "Indigenous peoples" sections of the Australasian chapter, and the "Fisheries on the Move", "Indigenous knowledge & climate adaptation", and "Climate change & water borne disease" cross chapter boxes within the main report. The report is due to be released in 2022.

Citizen science is a key approach to Pecl's research, and she is heavily involved in science communication and engagement. Pecl has written three articles for The Conversation to communicate her research regarding species' range shifts, the effects of climate change on Australian fishery species, and citizen science. In 2020, Pecl helped develop an educational card game of Tasmanian marine species. She has been involved in numerous public outreach events to educate stakeholders and communities on the impacts of climate change.

== Honours and recognition ==
Pecl was appointed a Member of the Order of Australia in the 2024 King's Birthday Honours for "significant service to science, particularly ecological research, and to tertiary education". She was inducted onto the Tasmanian Honour Roll of Women in 2025.

== Selected publications ==
- Pecl, G., Ogier, E., Jennings, S., van Putten, I., Crawford, C., Fogarty, H., Frusher, S., Hobday, A. J., Keane, J., Lee, E., MacLeod, C., Mundy, C., Stuart-Smith, J., & Tracey, S. (2019). "Autonomous adaptation to climate-driven change in marine biodiversity in a global marine hotspot". Ambio, 48 (12): 1498–1515. doi.org/10.1007/s13280-019-01186-x
- Scheffers, B. R., & Pecl, G. (2019). Persecuting, protecting or ignoring biodiversity under climate change. Nature Climate Change, 9 (8): 581–586. doi.org/10.1038/s41558-019-0526-5
- Pecl, G. T., Araújo, M. B., Bell, J. D., Blanchard, J., Bonebrake, T. C., Chen, I.-C., Clark, T. D., Colwell, R. K., Danielsen, F., Evengård, B., Falconi, L., Ferrier, S., Frusher, S., Garcia, R. A., Griffis, R. B., Hobday, A. J., Janion-Scheepers, C., Jarzyna, M. A., Jennings, S., Lenoir, J., Linnetved, H. I., Martin, V. Y., McCormack, P. C., McDonald, J., Mitchell, N. J., Mustonen, T., . Pandolfi, J. M., Pettorelli, N., Popova, E., Robinson, S. A., Scheffers, B. R., Shaw, J. D., Sorte, C. J. B., Strugnell, J. M., Sunday, J. M., Tuanmu, M.-N., Vergés, A., Villanueva, C., Wernberg, T., Wapstra, E., Williams, S. E. (2017). "Biodiversity redistribution under climate change: Impacts on ecosystems and human well-being". Science, 355 (6332). doi.org/10.1126/science.aai9214
- Johnson, C. R., Banks, S. C., Barrett, N. S., Cazassus, F., Dunstan, P. K., Edgar, G. J., Frusher, S. D., Gardner, C., Haddon, M., Helidoniotis, F., Hill, K. L., Holbrook, N. J., Hosie, G. W., Last, P. R., Ling, S. D., Melbourne-Thomas, J., Miller, K., Pecl, G. T., Richardson, A. J., Ridgway, K. R., Rintoul, S. R., Ritz, D. A., Ross, D. J., Sanderson, J. C., Shepherd, S. A., Swadling, K. M., Taw, N. (2011). "Climate change cascades: Shifts in oceanography, species’ ranges and subtidal marine community dynamics in eastern Tasmania". Journal of Experimental Marine Biology and Ecology, 400 (1–2): 17–32. doi.org/10.1016/j.jembe.2011.02.032
- Last, P. R., White, W. T., Gledhill, D. C., Hobday, A. J., Brown, R., Edgar, G. J., & Pecl, G. (2011). "Long-term shifts in abundance and distribution of a temperate fish fauna: A response to climate change and fishing practices". Global Ecology and Biogeography, 20 (1): 58–72. doi.org/10.1111/j.1466-8238.2010.00575.x

== Personal life ==
Gretta Pecl is separated with two children. She is on the advisory board of aKIDemic life, a free resource hub for academics with caring responsibilities.
