= Aquaculture of squid =

Farming of cephalopods for food

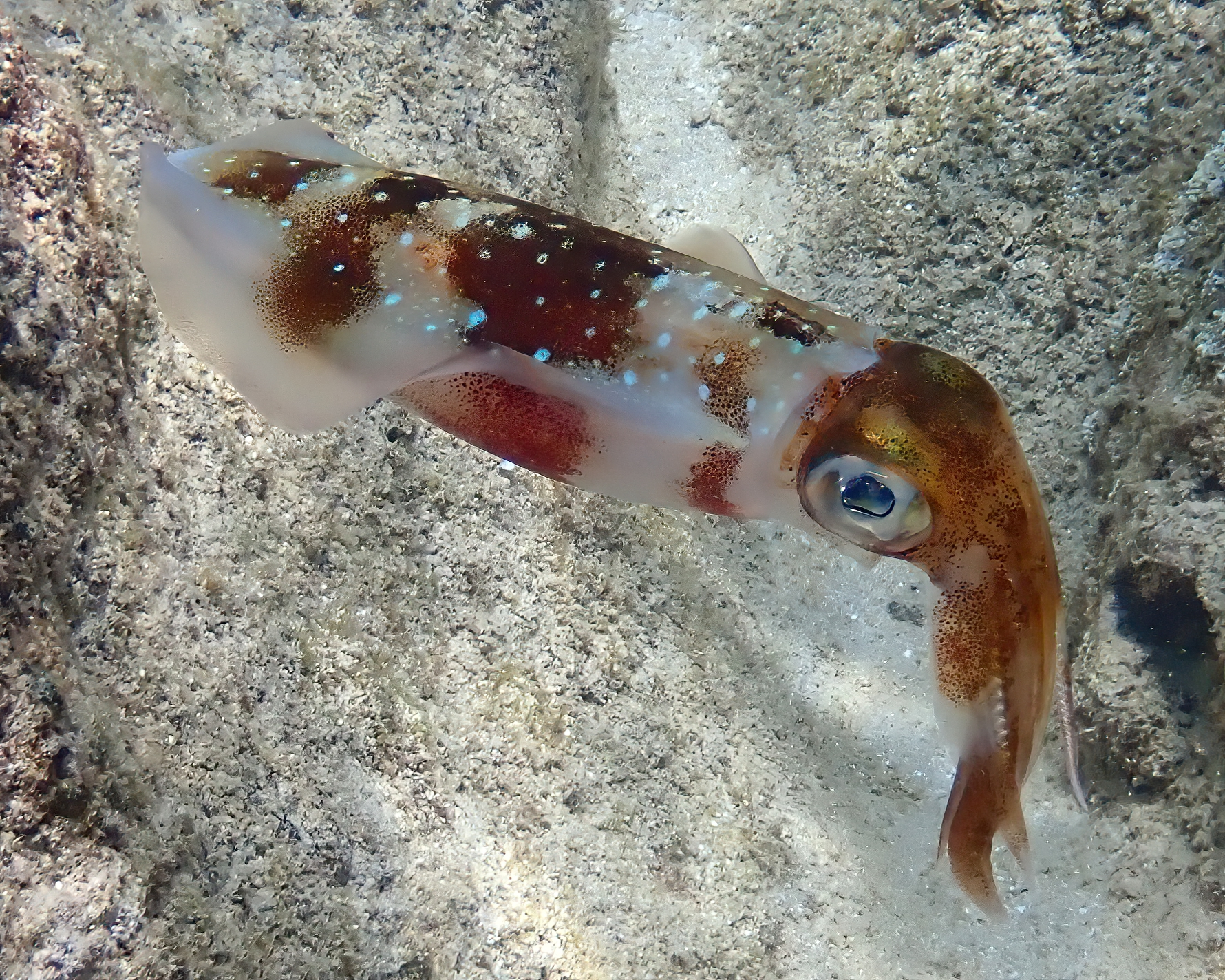
Aquaculture of the bigfin reef squid or oval squid (Sepioteuthis lessoniana) has been attempted since the 1980s

Squid and cuttlefish (scientifically, decapod molluscs) have long been valued as food, having been targeted in squid fisheries for centuries, but the advent of squid aquaculture is relatively recent, with experimental cultures being attempted in the latter half of the 20th and first half of the 21st centuries.

== Species ==
Most species of commercial squid come from wild sources. Aquaculture attempts are limited to some coastal species. For example, pelagic (open ocean-inhabiting) squids of the family Ommastrephidae (Ommastrephes sp., Nototodarus sp., Todarodes sp., Illex sp.) have never been aquacultured. As wild stocks decrease and catch rates become unpredictable, commercial cultures are increasingly seen as an alternative.

Aquaculture experiments have involved Uroteuthis chinensis, Hawaiian bobtail squid (Euprymna scolopes), flamboyant and paintpot cuttlefish (Ascarosepion spp.), spineless cuttlefish (Sepiella inermis), pharaoh cuttlefish (Acanthosepion pharaonis), and bigfin reef squid or oval squid (Sepioteuthis lessoniana).

== Challenges ==
Raising cephalopods faces several issues pertaining to their biology. Due to their epidermal projections they have an increased surface area, which renders them sensitive to lowered water quality, especially with elevated levels of ammonia and nitrogen compounds. Live feeding is often necessary as squid must be directly offered thawed frozen food; they do not actively seek it out, unlike live prey.

Reproduction in captivity is also a challenge. Coastal squid do reproduce readily in captivity, though an optimal male to female ratio may be beneficial in maintaining a breeding operation. Raising the resultant offspring is more difficult, and often has a high mortality rate. Measures to improve offspring yield include artificial incubation to prevent biofouling and cannibalism of eggs, controlled lighting levels, appropriately-sized live food (such as mysis shrimp), and preventing stressors such as noise, vibration, excessive water flow, and enclosure maintenance. As a result, cephalopod aquaculture is costly and labor-intensive, and live feeding may have biosecurity risks. These factors have prevented the development of squid aquaculture towards an economic scale.

== Attempts ==
Small scale experimental cultures began in the 1980s, attempting to raise oval squid and cuttlefish.

In the 2020s, a team from the Okinawa Institute of Science and Technology (OIST) is attempting to raise oval squid using formulated diets, automated feeding, and recirculating aquaculture systems to lower costs and increase scalability and sustainability. The research team says that these squid need three months to reach market size and are free from parasites common in wild squid (such as Anisakis). The squid culture has been sustained for ten generations, and the team has patented their methods, seeking commercialization through the startup Kwahuu Ocean.
