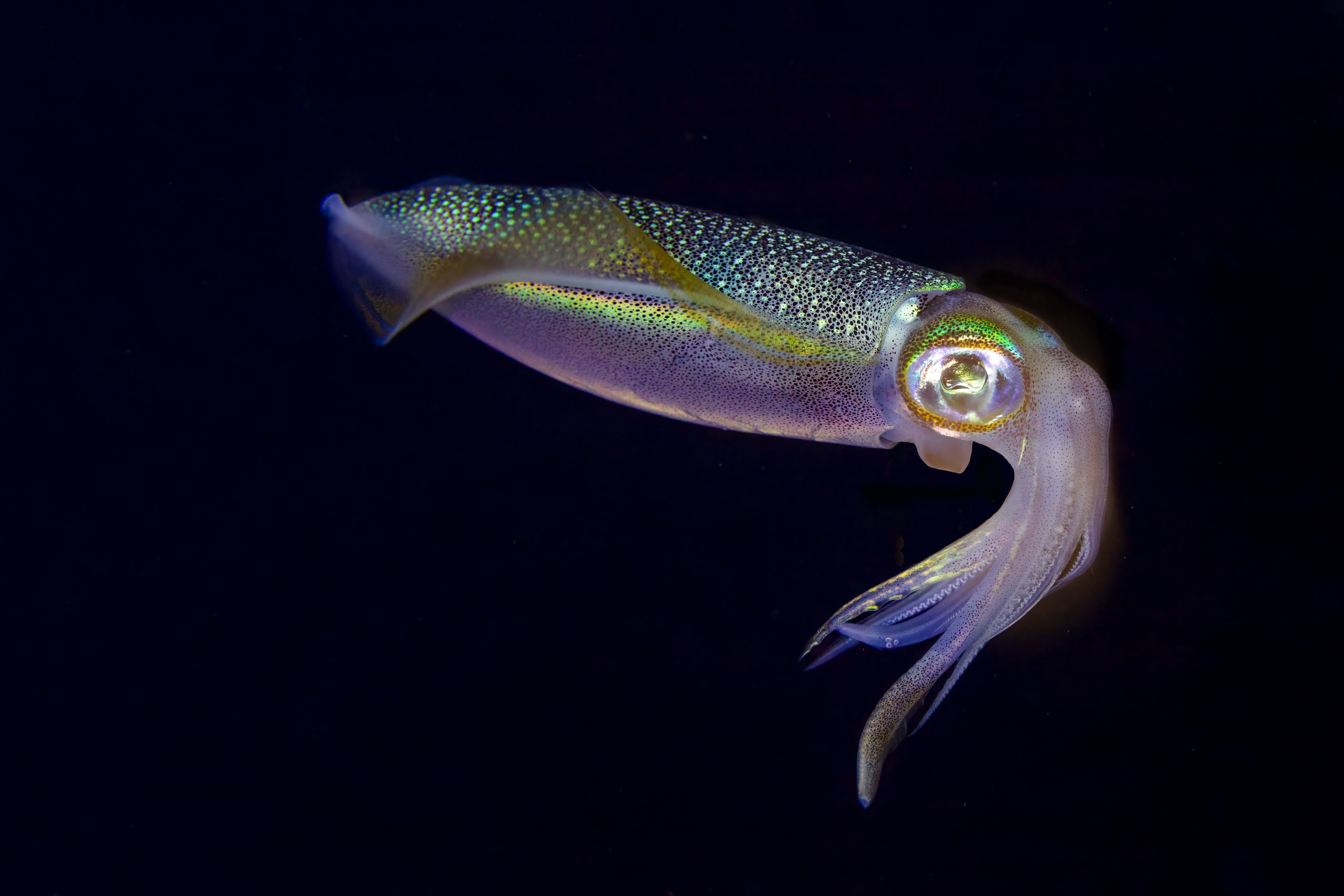
- A bigfin reef squid in Madagascar, lateral view
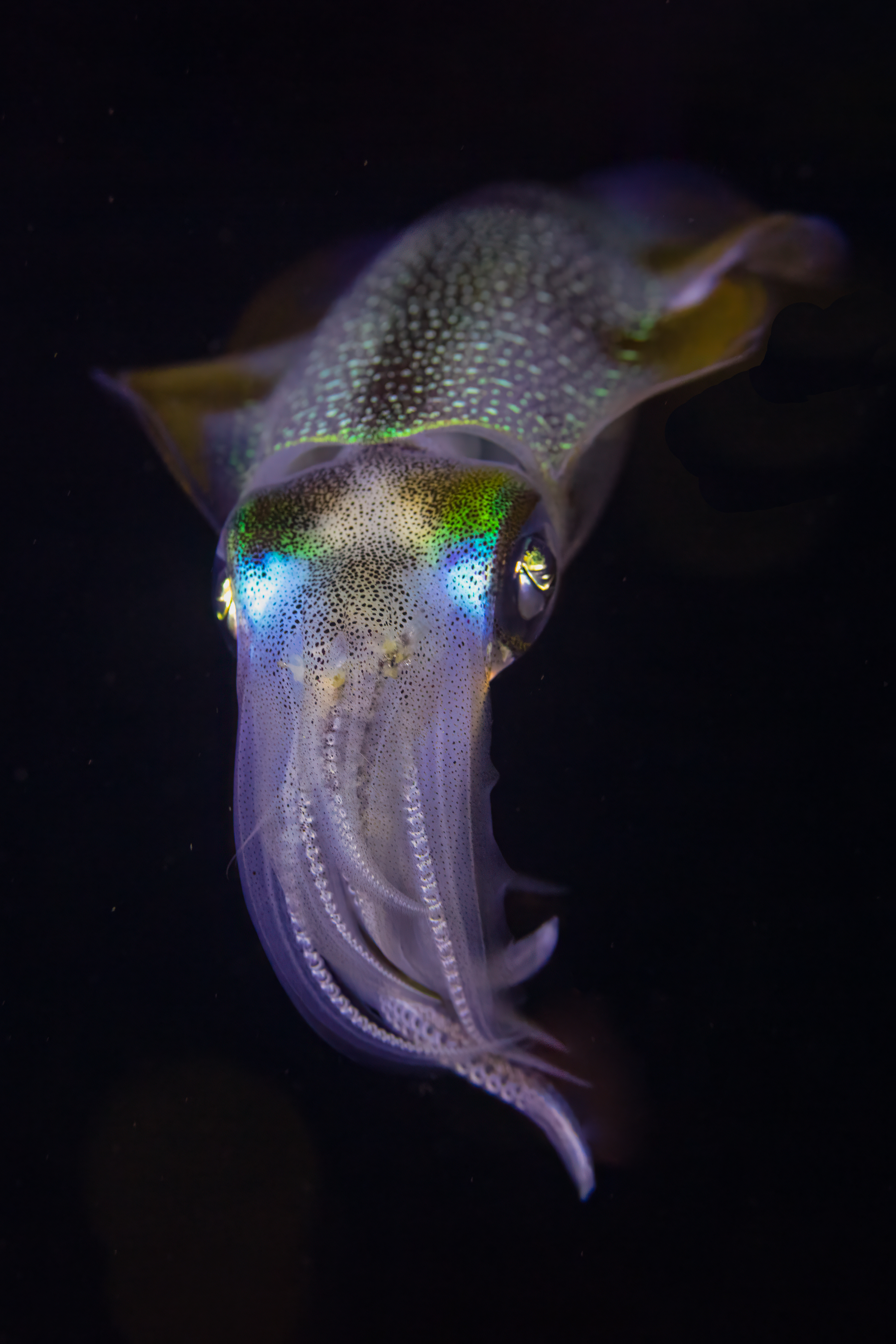
- Front view

Conservation status
- Data Deficient (IUCN 3.1)

Scientific classification
- Kingdom: Animalia
- Phylum: Mollusca
- Class: Cephalopoda
- Order: Myopsida
- Family: Loliginidae
- Genus: Sepioteuthis
- Species: S. lessoniana

Binomial name
- Sepioteuthis lessoniana Férussac, 1831 in Lesson, 1830–1831
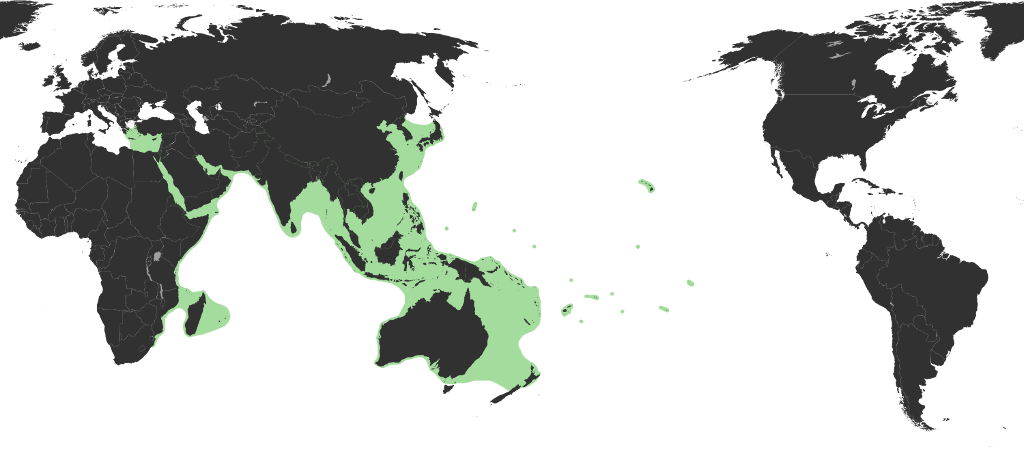
- estimated native range

Synonyms
- Sepioteuthis arctipinnis Gould, 1852; Sepioteuthis brevis Owen, 1881; Sepioteuthis doreiensis Quoy, 1835; Sepioteuthis guinensis Quoy & Gaimard, 1832; Sepioteuthis hemprichii Ehrenberg, 1831; Sepioteuthis indica Goodrich, 1896; Sepioteuthis krempfi Robson, 1928; Sepioteuthis lessoniana Férussac, 1831; Sepioteuthis lunulata Quoy & Gaimard, 1832; Sepioteuthis malayana Wülker, 1913; Sepioteuthis mauritiana Quoy & Gaimard, 1832; Sepioteuthis neoguinaica Pfeffer, 1884; Sepioteuthis sieboldi Joubin, 1898; Sepioteuthis sinensis D'Orbigny, 1848

= Bigfin reef squid =

Bigfin reef squid Sepioteuthis lessoniana

Species of squid

Sepioteuthis lessoniana, commonly known as the bigfin reef squid, tiger squid, glitter squid, oval squid, or northern calamari, is a species complex in the loliginid squid family. It is one of the three currently recognized species belonging to the genus Sepioteuthis. Studies in 1993, however, have indicated that bigfin reef squids may comprise several cryptic species, that are very similar and closely related.

Bigfin reef squids are characterised by a large oval fin that extends throughout the margins of its mantle, giving them a superficial similarity to cuttlefish. They are small to medium-sized squids, averaging 3.8 to 33 centimetres (1.5 to 13.0 in) in length. They exhibit elaborate mating displays and usually spawn in May, but it can vary by location. The paralarvae resemble miniature adults and are remarkable for already having the capability to change body colouration upon hatching. Bigfin reef squids have the fastest recorded growth rates of any large marine invertebrate, reaching 600 g (1.3 lb) in only four months. They are a short-lived species, with a maximum recorded lifespan of 315 days.

The diet of bigfin reef squids comprises mainly crustaceans and small fish. They are found in the temperate and tropical waters of the Pacific and Indian Oceans, and have recently been introduced into the Mediterranean as a Lessepsian migrant. They are commonly found near the shoreline, near rocks, and coral reefs. They are fished extensively for human consumption in Asia. Because of their rapid growth rate, short life span, and tolerance to handling and captivity, bigfin reef squids are regarded as one of the most promising species for mariculture. They are also a valuable source of giant axons for medical research.

== Taxonomy and nomenclature ==
Bigfin reef squids are also known as northern calamary in Australia and New Zealand, to distinguish them from the southern reef squid (or southern calamary), Sepioteuthis australis. Other common names include green-eyed squid in English; koonthal in Malayalam; oosi kanava in Tamil; calmar tonnelet in French; calamar manopla in Spanish; Großflossen-Riffkalmar in German; mu he`e in Hawaiian; 莱氏拟乌贼 in Chinese; torak in Malaysian; アオリイカ (aori-ika) in Japanese; kinn mon in Burmese; and 무늬오징어 (munuiojingeo), 흰꼴뚜기 (huinkkolttugi), or 미즈이카 (mizuika) in Korean.

Sepioteuthis lessoniana is one of the three currently recognised species classified under the genus Sepioteuthis of the pencil squid family, Loliginidae. It belongs to the suborder Myopsina of the squid order Teuthida. Sepioteuthis literally means 'cuttlefish squid', from Greek: σηπία (sēpía, 'cuttlefish') and τευθίς (teuthis, 'squid').

It was first described by the French naturalist André Étienne d'Audebert de Férussac and named after René Primevère Lesson. The type specimen was collected by Lesson off the coast of New Guinea during the circumnavigational voyage of the French corvette La Coquille (1822–1825) under the command of Louis Isidore Duperrey. Numerous other species of Sepioteuthis were described from the Pacific and Indian Oceans in the late 19th century and in the early 20th century. In 1939 the Belgian malacologist William Adam examined the specimens of Sepioteuthis recovered from the tropical western Pacific. He synonymised the twelve species then considered valid under Sepioteuthis lessoniana.

A study in 1993 by Segawa et al. revealed that the population of S. lessoniana in Okinawa may actually be composed of three distinct species. This was confirmed in genetic studies by Izuka et al. in 1994. Triantafillos and Adams in 2005 also showed that S. lessoniana in Shark Bay, Australia is composed of two species. These findings indicate that S. lessoniana may actually comprise several very similar and closely related species. It is now believed that S. lessoniana is a cryptic species complex.

== Description ==
Like other members of the genus Sepioteuthis, bigfin reef squids are easy to distinguish from other squids in that they possess thick and muscular oval fins that extend around almost the entire mantle. The fins extend about 83 to 97% of the mantle length and are 67 to 70% of the mantle length in width. Because of these fins, bigfin reef squids are sometimes mistaken for cuttlefish, a fact reflected by their scientific names. A narrow blue or white line is visible at the point of attachment of the fins to the mantle. A fleshy ridge is also present where the fins meet at the back of the squid.

The mantles of bigfin reef squids are cylindrical, tapering to a blunt cone at the posterior. The mantle is usually 4 to 33 cm (1.6 to 13.0 in) long in males and 3.8 to 25.6 cm (1.5 to 10.1 in) long in females. Both sexes can reach a maximum mantle length of 38 cm (15 in). Adult males weigh 403.5 to 1,415 g (0.890 to 3.120 lb), while adult females are 165 to 1,046 g (0.364 to 2.306 lb). Both sexes can attain a maximum documented weight of 1.8 kg (4.0 lb). The forward margin of the mantle on the ventral side is concave.

Their eyes are large and covered entirely by a transparent secondary cornea. They are greenish at the base. A pair of prominent ridges (olfactory crests) are present on the ventral surface of the head at the rear edge of the eyes. The mouth area is supported by seven triangular flaps (buccal lappets), each with 0 to 7 suckers of less than 0.2 mm in diameter and 18 to 25 teeth. The strong, curved, and short beaks (rostra) are mostly black to dark brown. The radula has seven rows of teeth.

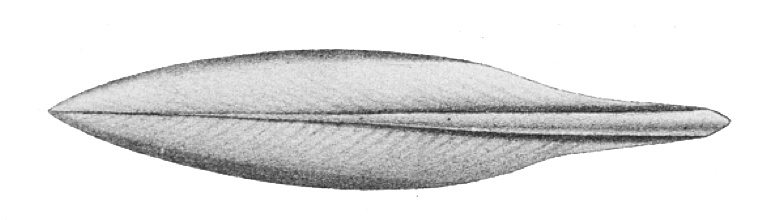
Gladius of S. lessoniana

The spermatophores of males are about 4.5 mm (0.18 in) long and 0.15 mm wide. The ink sac is pear-shaped, with a silvery blue-green outer layer. The vane of the gladius (the rigid internal remnants of the mollusc shell) is oval-shaped and pointed at both ends (lanceolate). It has a broad midrib (rachis).

The eight arms are thick, tapering to a narrow point. They are unequal in length, with arm pair I the shortest, followed by arm pair II and arm pair IV, and arm pair III the longest. All of them possess two rows of suckers. Each sucker has a diameter less than 2 mm (0.08 in), decreasing distally, and a ring of 17 to 28 sharp acute teeth. The left arm of pair IV in males is modified into a sexual organ known as the hectocotylus. They bear long fleshy protrusions (papillae) with toothless suckers at the distal portion. The tentacles are thick and long, extending the length of the mantle when retracted. They are slightly compressed laterally. A prominent ridge (a keel) is present on the outer surface of each of the tentacle clubs (the wide tip of the tentacles). There are four rows of suckers on the manus (proximal part of the club) and the dactylus (distal part of the club). The larger suckers in the centre of the manus have 17 to 18 widely spaced teeth.

=== Coloration ===
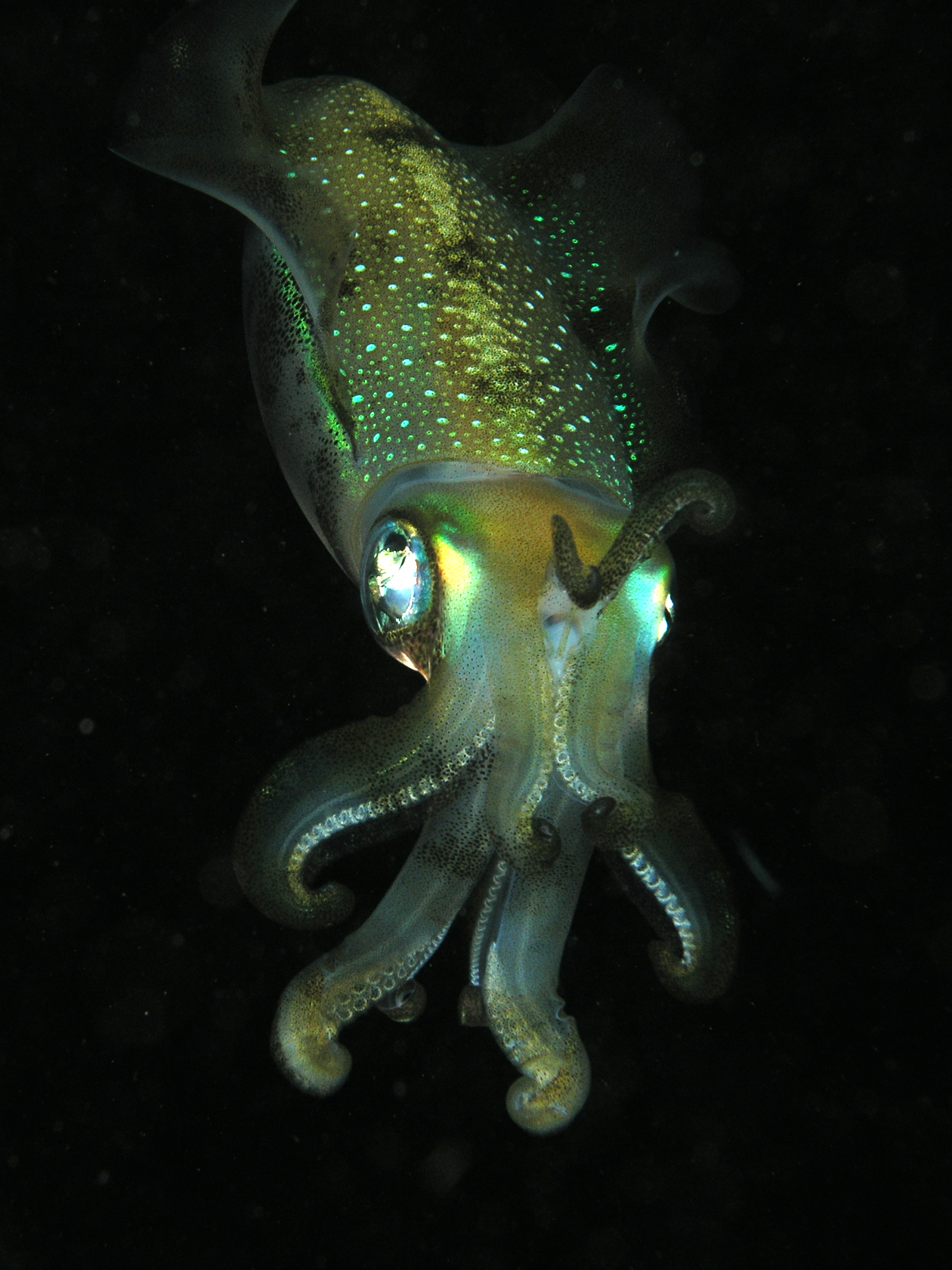
A bigfin reef squid from the Komodo National Park showing vivid iridescence. They are often attracted to divers' lights at night.

Large chromatophores densely cover the upper surfaces of the head, mantle and arms. They are distributed more sparsely on the ventral side. The fins do not possess chromatophores on the underside. Living specimens range in colour from translucent creamy white through pale yellow to brownish pink and brownish violet.

Like some other cephalopods, bigfin reef squids are capable of metachrosis – rapidly changing body colouration and patterns through voluntary control of chromatophores. They also possess iridophores (particularly in the head), a form of structural colouration that produces iridescent metallic greens and red when illuminated. They are also possibly one of two squid species with leucophores. Leucophores are a reflector-type structural colouration that reflects ambient light, such that they are white in white light, green in green light, and so on. Bigfin reef squids are remarkable for having the ability to produce complex body patterns from the moment they hatch. In comparison, other loliginid squid species do not produce complex body patterns at less than four months of age. The patterns produced by bigfin reef squids, however, are less diverse than those of the Caribbean reef squids.

Bigfin reef squids do not possess photophores, and are thus not truly bioluminescent.

=== Sexual dimorphism ===
It is often difficult to superficially distinguish between male and female bigfin reef squids. Some authors say that females are generally smaller than males, but this distinction is not observed in other studies. Closer examination of sexually mature specimens, however, will usually distinguish males from females by the presence of the hectocotylus on the fourth left arm in males, and the nidamental glands and the pale ovaries within the mantle in females. Males also purportedly show a more conspicuous pattern of transverse streaks on their dorsal side.

== Ecology ==
=== Distribution and habitat ===
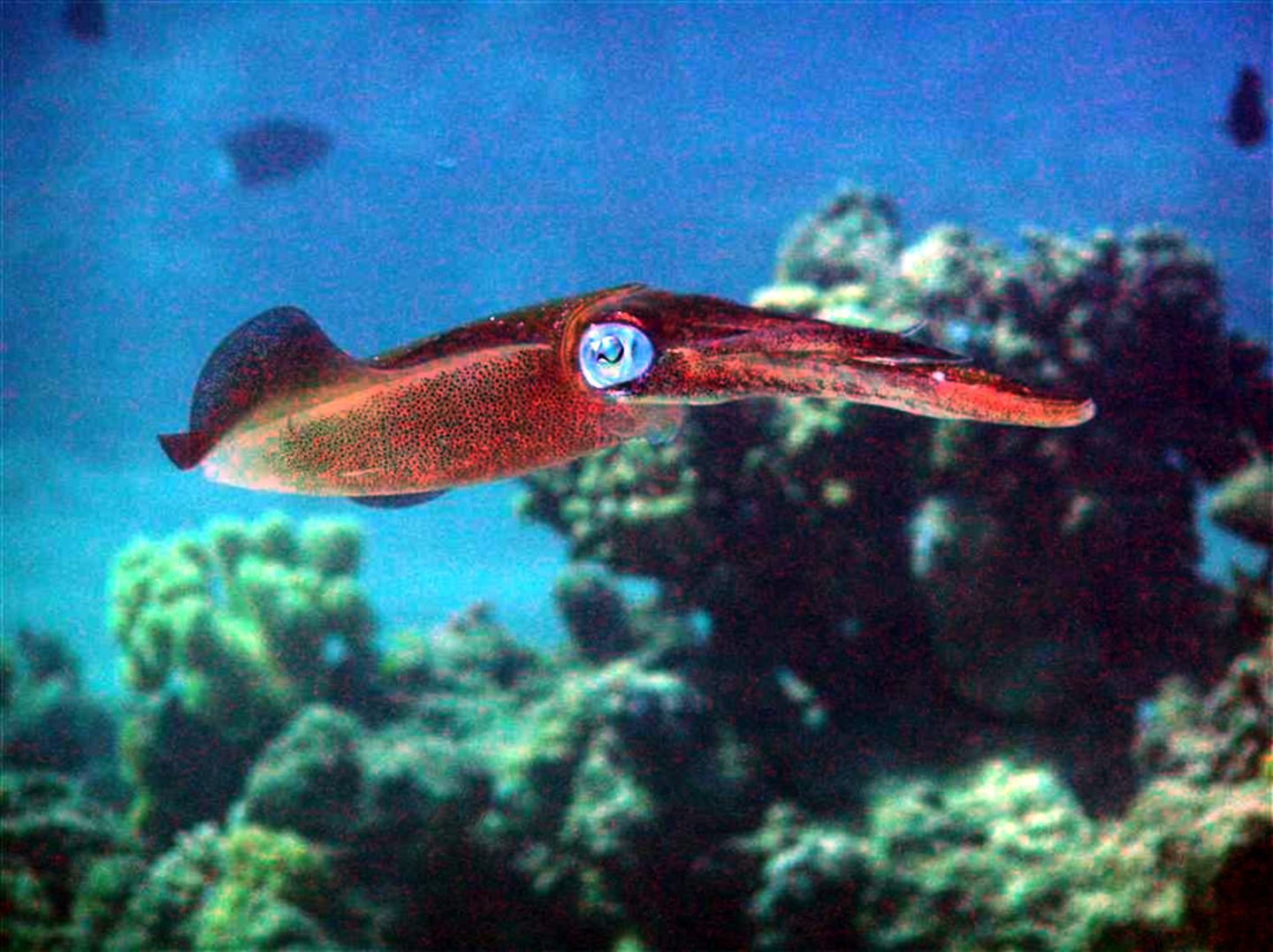
A bigfin reef squid among corals in the Red Sea of Egypt

The bigfin reef squid is a neritic warm water-dwelling squid. They are usually found 0 to 100 m (0 to 328 ft) below the water's surface. They tend to remain close to the shoreline, near rocks and reefs. They are slightly more active during the night and will move to deeper waters or find cover in daytime. Large numbers of juveniles can often be found hiding beneath floating driftwood.

The bigfin reef squid is the most widespread species in the genus Sepioteuthis. It is found in temperate and tropical regions of the Indian Ocean and the western Pacific Ocean. Their original range extends east to the Hawaiian Islands, west to the Red Sea, north to Japan, and south to Australia and New Zealand (42°N to 42°S and 32°E to 154°W). The range has also expanded to include parts of the Mediterranean Sea. In 2002, bigfin reef squids were first documented in the Gulf of İskenderun of the southeastern Mediterranean Sea. They may have already existed in significant populations in the area prior to their discovery in 2002, as they have acquired a common name among the fishermen of the Aegean Sea – σουπιοκαλάμαρο (soupiocalamaro, literally "cuttlefish-like squid"). It is a Lessepsian migrant, reaching the Mediterranean Sea through the Suez Canal.

=== Diet and predators ===
The bigfin reef squid eats a variety of different marine organisms. Its main prey are usually prawns and other crustaceans, and fish. Captive specimens were observed to consume one fish every 2 to 25 hours.

Bigfin reef squids are, in turn, preyed upon by tuna, marlin, swordfish, and other predator fish and groundfish.

=== Parasites ===
Bigfin reef squids serve as hosts to the copepod ectoparasite Doridicola similis and the worm-like dicyemid endoparasites Dicyema koshidai and Dicyema orientale.

== Biology and behaviour ==
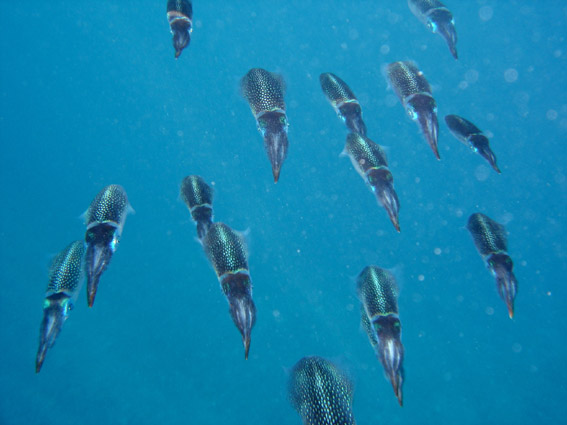
A school of bigfin reef squids from the island of Réunion, off the eastern coast of Madagascar

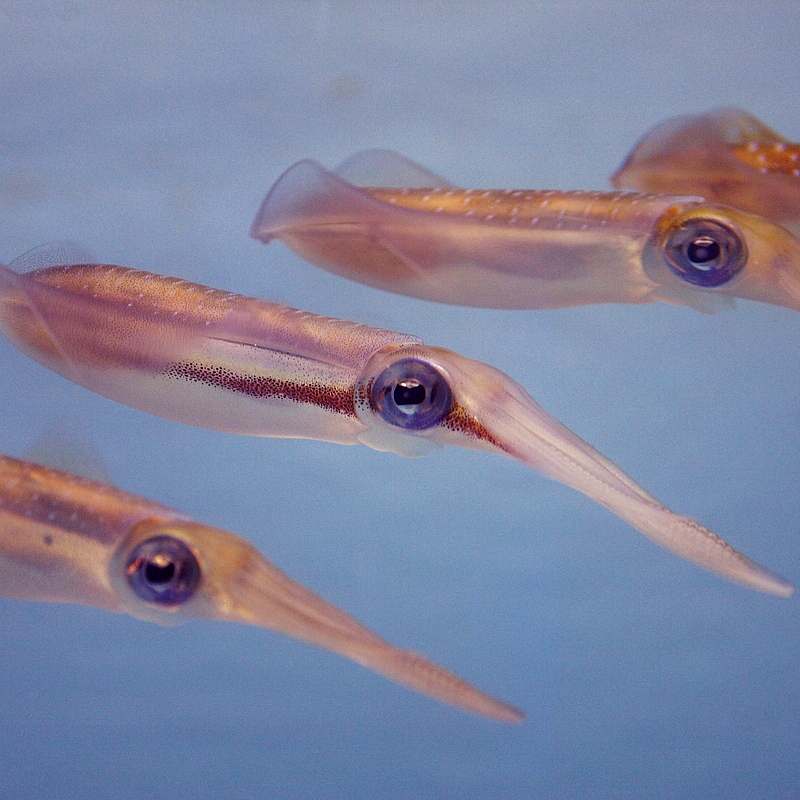
Schooling bigfin reef squids from the Suma Aqualife Park, Kobe, Japan

Bigfin reef squids are closely related to the Caribbean reef squid (Sepioteuthis sepioidea), a species noted for its complex social interactions. Like Caribbean reef squids, bigfin reef squids also exhibit elaborate mating displays.

Bigfin reef squids also exhibit both schooling and shoaling behaviours. Very young bigfin reef squids will also stay close together (shoaling), but do not swim together parallel to each other (schooling). Unlike most other squid species, bigfin reef squids are rarely cannibalistic. Shoals can include animals of different sizes without the threat of larger members attacking and consuming the smaller members. Whether bigfin reef squids recognise each other individually still remains unknown.

=== Phototaxis ===
Bigfin reef squids exhibit strong positive phototactic behaviour (attraction to light) and will move readily within a certain distance of a light source. Studies have proposed that this might be an involuntary stimulus behaviour, as the squids immediately stop all other movements once a light source is switched on. The colour of the light does not matter, but it has been shown that they react more strongly to underwater lights between the intensities of 1.5 to 2.5 lx, with peak ranges of 2.5 to 10.0 lx.

=== Hearing ===
Bigfin reef squids and the common octopus (Octopus vulgaris) were studied to resolve a century-long debate over whether cephalopods can hear. Unlike fishes, cephalopods do not possess air-filled swim bladders, which might amplify sound waves travelling in water. The results were published in 2009. It showed that bigfin reef squids and octopuses utilise their statocysts for detecting vibrations, an organ primarily used for maintaining spatial orientation. The common octopus can hear sounds between 400 Hz and 1000 Hz. Bigfin reef squids have a slightly better hearing range of 400 Hz to 1500 Hz. Both hear best at a frequency of 600 Hz. Relatively, their hearing is comparable to prawns and some other invertebrates but is less sensitive than that of most fishes.

The difference in the hearing ranges for octopus and bigfin reef squids may be explained by the difference in their habitats. The octopus is demersal (bottom-dwelling) with excellent camouflage capabilities. Bigfin reef squids, on the other hand, are usually in open water with limited hiding places. Hearing would thus be more important for the squids to escape predators. The ability to hear is particularly relevant for avoiding mammalian predators of the suborder Odontoceti (particularly dolphins), who use echolocation to find prey.

=== Mating behaviour ===
Video of swimming bigfin reef squids

Bigfin reef squids exhibit two most common social body patterning and posturing behaviours related to mating.

The first is dubbed "accentuated gonads", in which they will sometimes increase the visibility of their gonads while reducing the rest of their body colouration. This makes their reproductive organs appear bright white through the transparent mantle. It may indicate the reproductive condition of the signalling squid.

Another common behaviour, primarily seen in males, is dubbed "spread arms", in which the squid will slightly tilt its body forward, head down and arms spread widely and raised above. The mantle is darkened. This behaviour is exhibited mostly when the squids are chasing or following another individual. It is thought to be a signal of reproductive arousal or aggression, similar to the "zebra display" behaviour of Sepioteuthis sepioidea, the "intense zebra display" behaviour of Sepia officinalis, and the "lateral display" of Loligo plei. Females will also sometimes use this display to rebuff courting males.

There are three known courtship behaviours in bigfin reef squids, dubbed "male-upturned" mating, "male-parallel" mating, and "head-to-head" mating. Actual insertion in each position lasts for only a few seconds.

"Male-upturned" mating involves rapid back and forth swimming by the courting male beside a slower-swimming female. The male will then flip over so that he is swimming upside down and quickly lunge forward towards the female. He will quickly eject several spermatophores from his funnel into his hectocotylus and attempt to deposit them on the female's mouth funnel, then jet away from the female. "Head-to-head" mating is regarded as a variation of this tactic.

"Male-parallel" mating involves the male and female swimming side by side. The male will then raise one or two of his arm pair I upwards and swing them back and forth. He moves below the female and clasps the female's neck with his arms. In contrast to the previous behaviours, in this position the male actually inserts his hectocotylus into the mantle cavity of the female, attaching the spermatophores right at the opening of the oviduct rather than at the mouth. Possibly for this reason, it is usually more successful in fertilizing the female than other mating behaviours.

In addition to the above, males will often engage in "sneaking" behaviour. In this scenario, a smaller male will attach spermatophores to the female's mouth area while she is being courted by a larger male using the "male-upturned" behaviour. Even when successful, the male using this strategy is usually chased away by the larger male afterwards.

The spermatophores usually remain embedded near the mouth of the female. Mating usually occurs well before spawning, but may also happen on the spawning grounds themselves. In those cases, the male will stay near the female's side as she lays eggs.

Males have been observed to exhibit mating behaviours with other males. Some males have been found with numerous spermatophores embedded in their mouth funnels. Since bigfin reef squids distinguish sex by visual cues, this may be a form of deception. The smaller males (termed "female mimics" or "sneaker males") might have assumed body patterning typical of females in order to trick larger males. Believing they are females, they will then waste their spermatophores on them. This behaviour has also been observed in other cephalopods.

=== Reproduction and life cycle ===
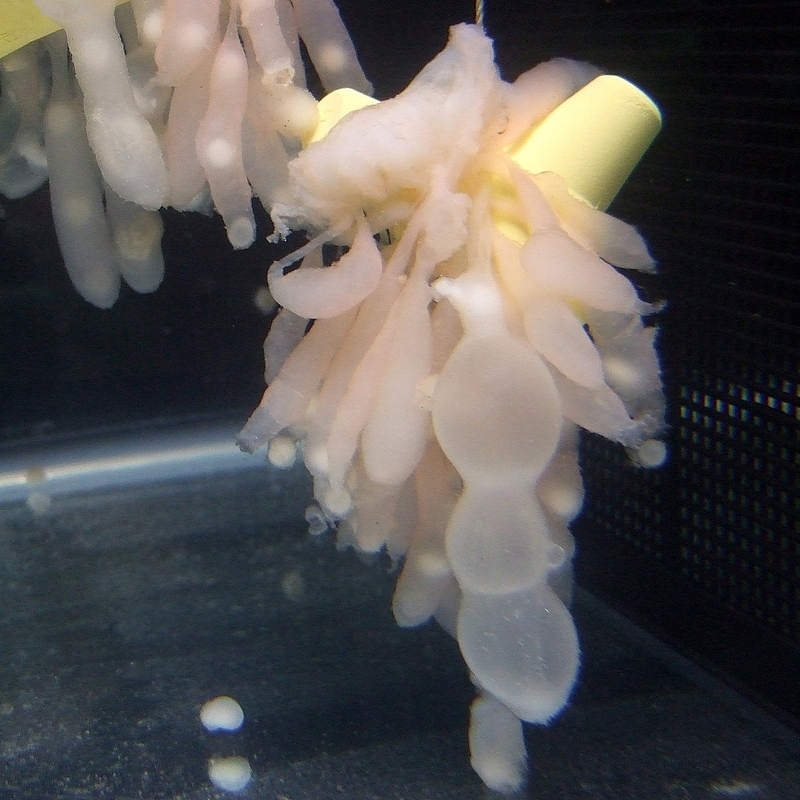
Egg strands of bigfin reef squids

The main spawning season for bigfin reef squids usually begins in May, but they lay eggs all year round and spawning seasons can vary by location. A single female can spawn more than once in her lifetime. Females can release 20 to 1180 eggs per individual and will die soon afterwards.

The females spawn by passing eggs from their oviducts. These eggs are then coated in gelatinous substances from the nidamental glands and oviducal glands, forming an egg 'capsule'. The egg capsules of the bigfin reef squids contain two to nine eggs each. These are laid in single straight strands on rocks, corals, aquatic plants, submerged branches and other surfaces. At this point, the eggs are 3 mm (0.12 in) in diameter and the egg capsules about 58.2 mm (2.29 in) in length and 12.6 mm (0.50 in) in width, on average.

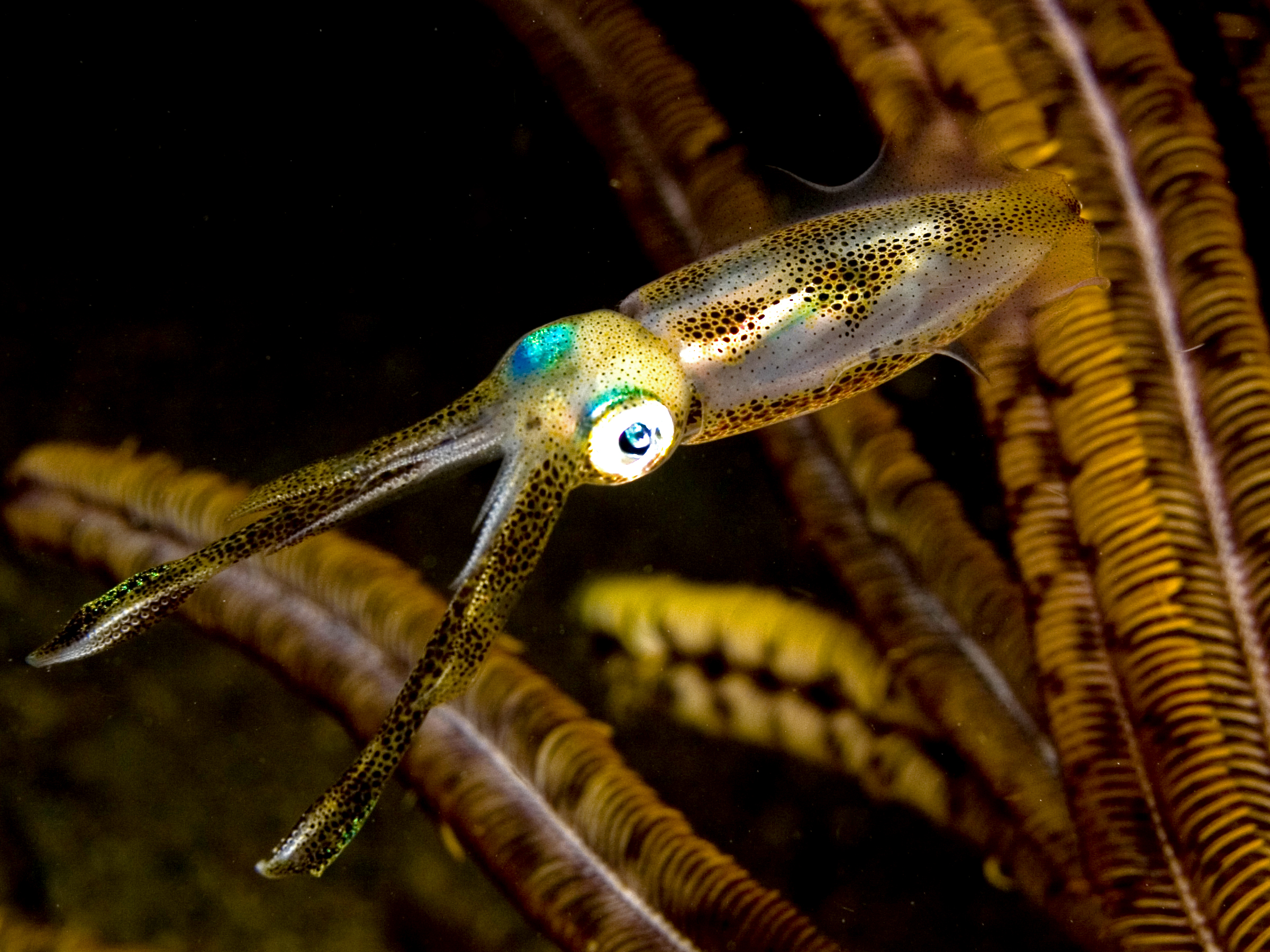
A small (possibly subadult) bigfin reef squid from East Timor

The capsules incubate for about 3 weeks, depending on temperature. In warmer Indonesia, the incubation period was recorded to be only 15 to 16 days, while in Thailand it takes around 20 to 22 days. They gradually enlarge by absorbing water, reaching around 82.4 mm (3.24 in) in length and 14.6 mm (0.57 in) in width. Unfertilised eggs remain milky white and do not develop further. Fertilised eggs undergo cell division reaching a diameter of 16 mm (0.63 in) with the developing embryo at 11 mm (0.43 in) on the day before hatching. Upon hatching, the paralarvae are 6 mm (0.24 in) in mantle length (excluding tentacles), with fully functioning fins and ink sacs. They resemble miniature adults and are already strong swimmers. They exhibit schooling behaviour two weeks after hatching.

Hatchlings are often cannibalistic. This is regarded as the main cause of death in young squids, particularly in dense populations. However, cannibalism usually happens only when eaten individuals were already weakened significantly or dead, so the actual cause of death may have been something else. Subadults are usually recognisable by their size, ranging from 20 to 60 mm (0.79 to 2.36 in) in length. They reach sexual maturity at less than 210 days in the wild. Males reach sexual maturity earlier than females. In captive populations, males mature 140 days after hatching at most. Females will begin spawning at around 156 to 196 days after hatching. Both males and females mature earlier in captivity than in the wild. Water temperature may play an important role in the earlier sexual maturation of captive specimens. High temperatures may induce shorter lifespans and smaller body sizes, while cooler temperatures favour longer lifespans and larger individuals.

Bigfin reef squids have one of the fastest recorded growth rates for any large marine invertebrate. They can reach 600 g (1.3 lb) in only four months. Nonetheless, size can not often be reliably correlated with age, as variations of body size within a generation is fairly common. In captivity, bigfin reef squids have a lifespan of 161 to 315 days for both sexes.

== Economic importance ==
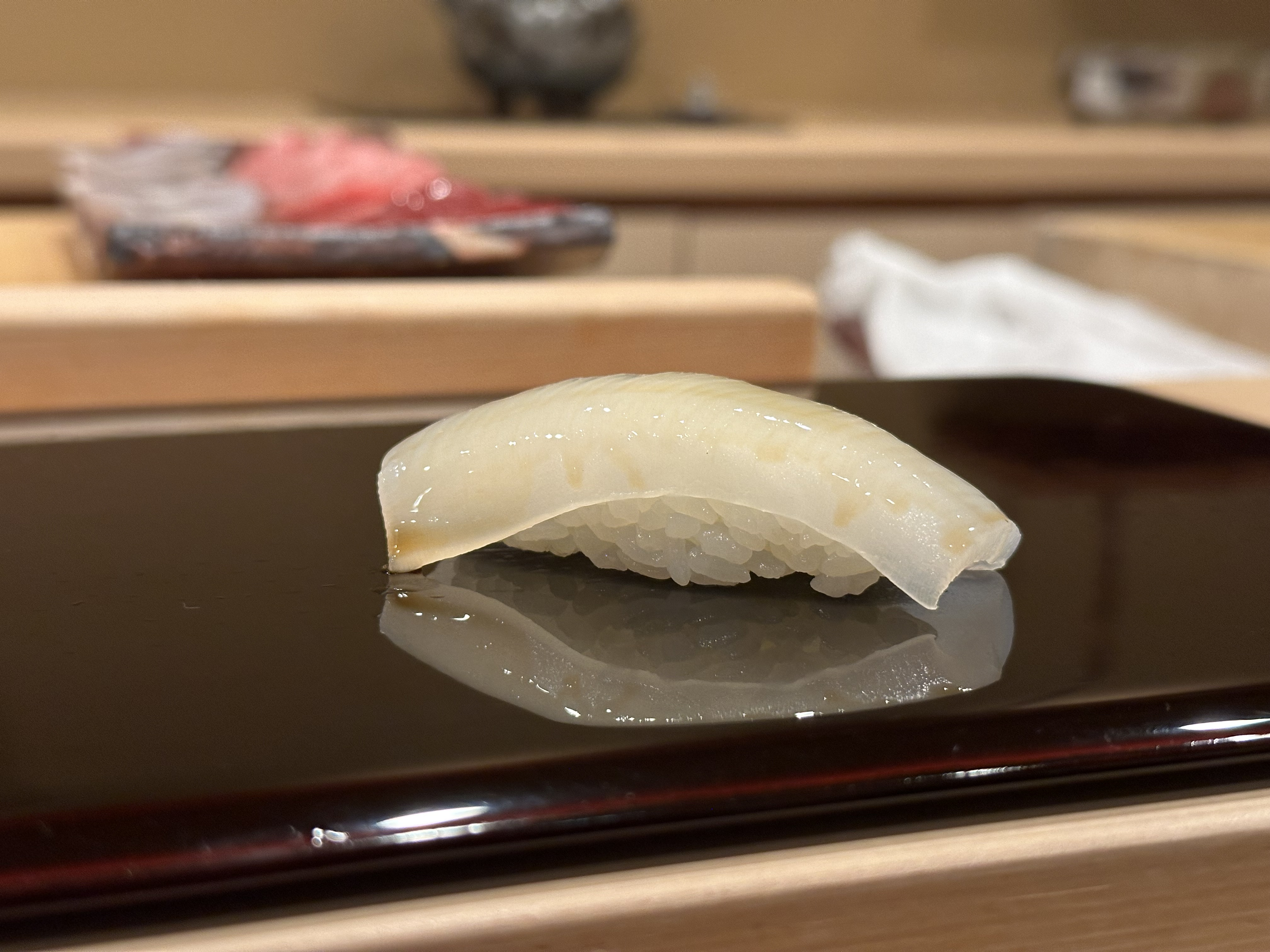
As sushi

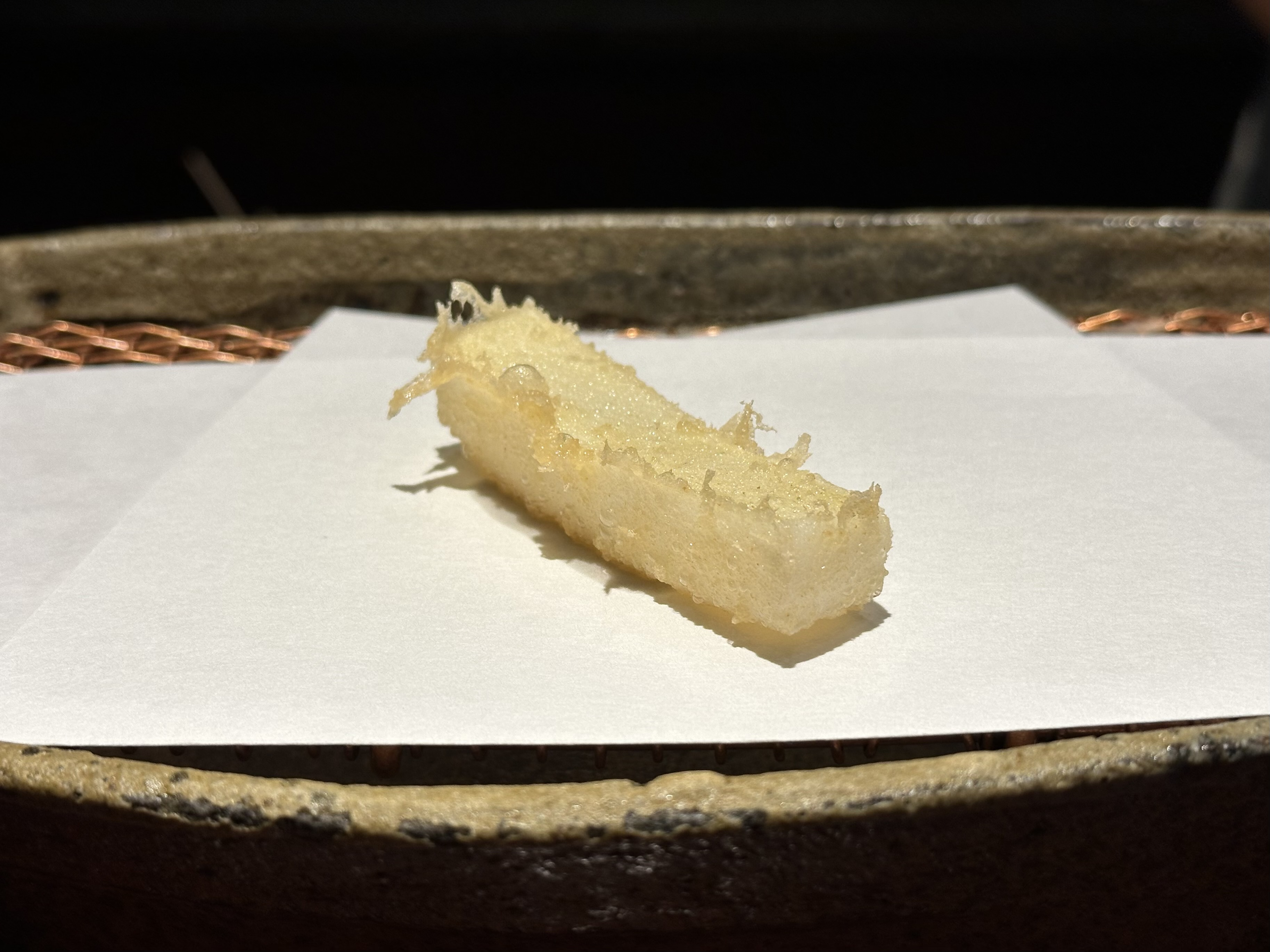
As tempura

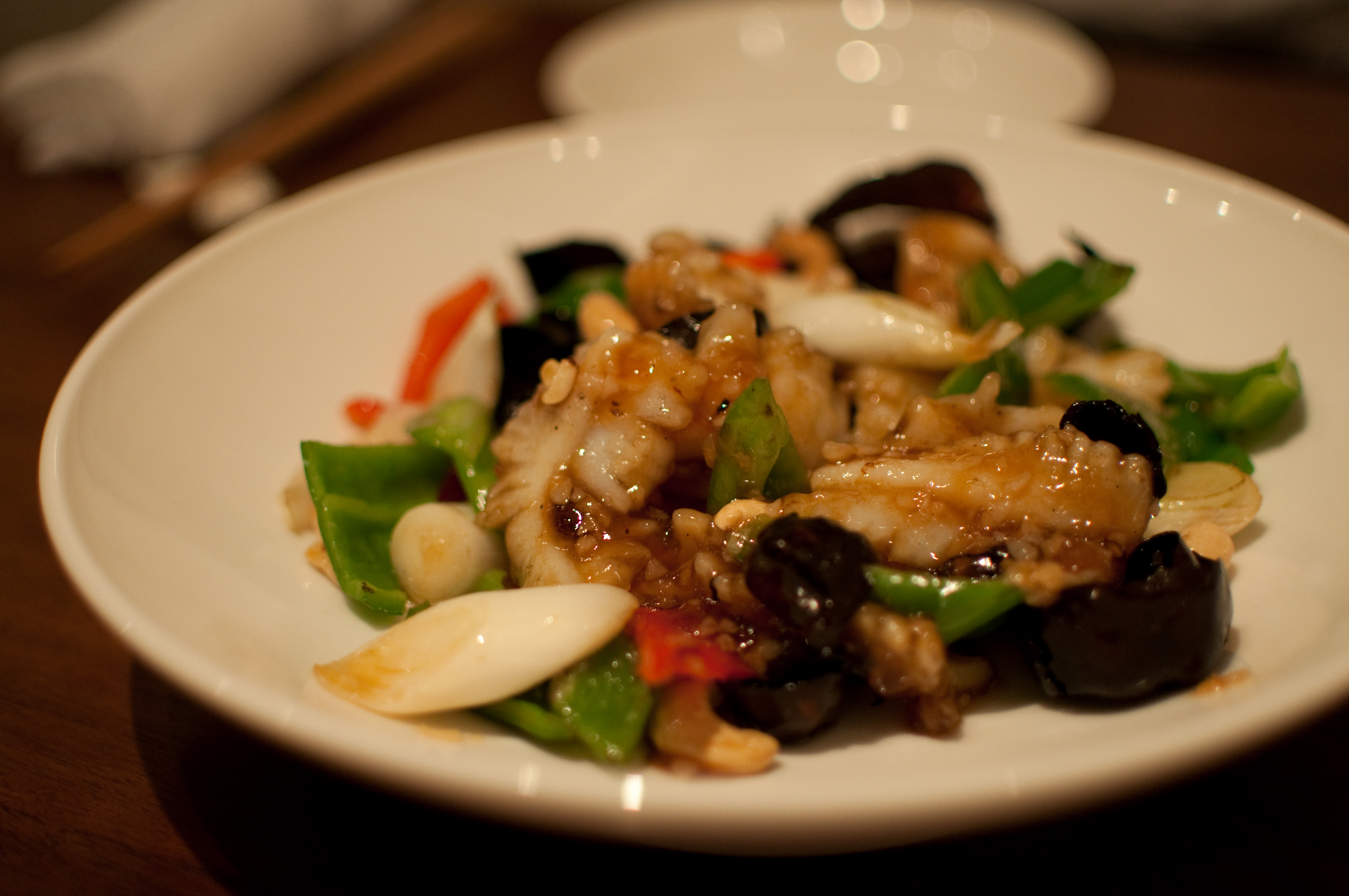
Stir-fried bigfin reef squid

=== Commercial fishing and human consumption ===
Bigfin reef squids are one of the most commercially important squid species, and are widely consumed as human food. They are usually caught in large numbers by trawling, seine fishing, or fixed net traps. In small-scale fishing, they are caught by jigging, drive-in nets, slingshot-driven spearguns, or with squid pots.

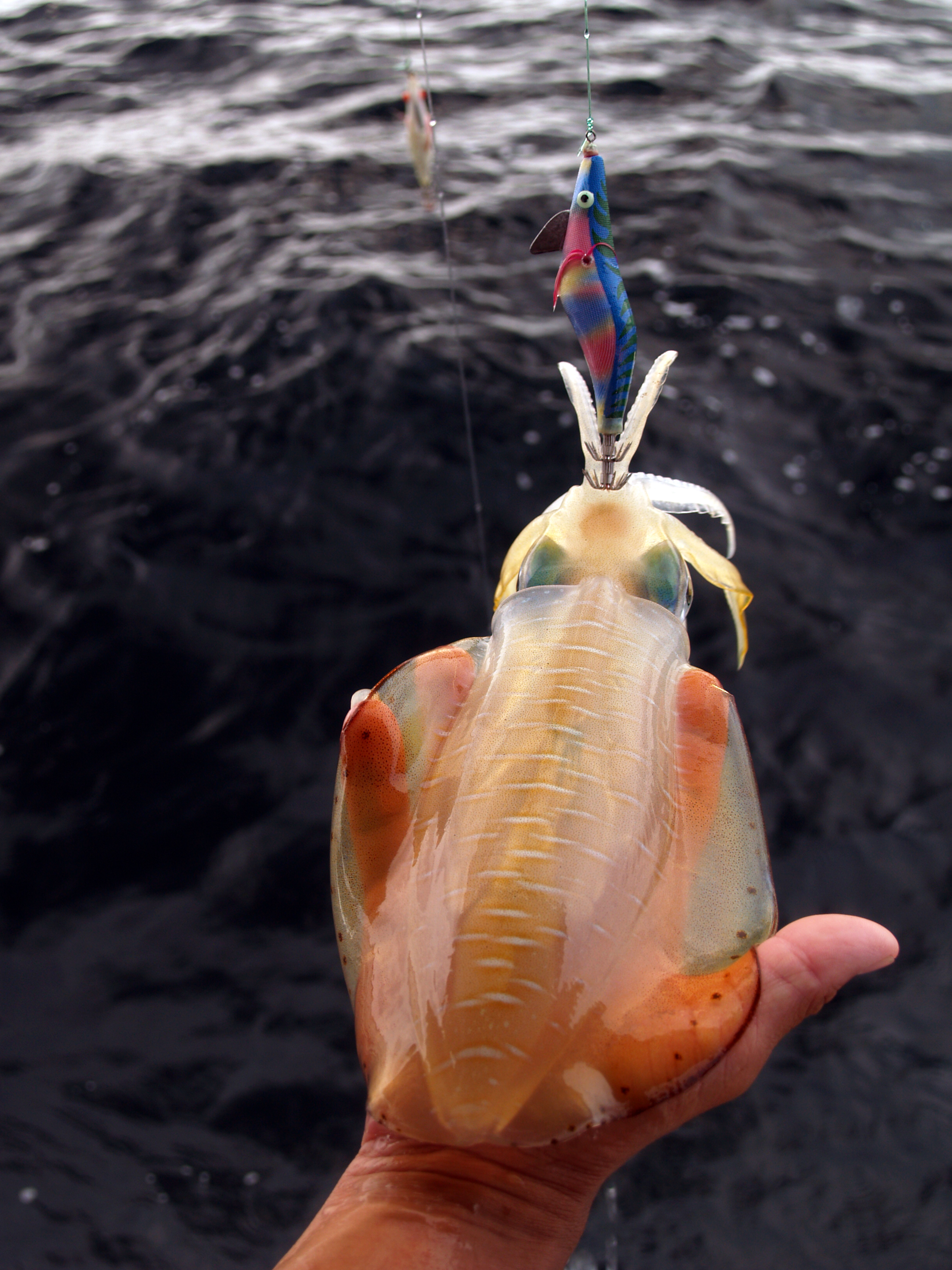
Bigfin reef squid caught off Pekan, Malaysia by jigging.

Fishing operations for bigfin reef squids (particularly in jigging) are usually done at night and utilise bright lights, taking advantage of their attraction to illumination. They are especially abundant during the full moon and in foggy weather. Populations of bigfin reef squids are not seasonal, and they can be fished throughout the year. They are also used as fish bait in hook and line fishing.

Because of their rapid growth rate, short life span, and tolerance to handling and captivity, bigfin reef squids are regarded as one of the most promising species for mariculture. Although studies on the matter have been ongoing since the 1980s, successful trials for a closed-cycle aquaculture of this species was only achieved in the 2020s.

=== Biomedical research ===
The bigfin reef squid is the first squid species to have been cultured for more than one generation. It is remarkable for its ability to readily adapt to being confined in tanks, and is one of the few squid species of which the entire life span has been observed under laboratory conditions.

Bigfin reef squids are also valuable sources for squid giant axons used in research in neuroscience and physiology. Unlike axons of other animals, squid axons are very large. Those of bigfin reef squids can range in diameter from 350 to 560 μm (in contrast to the typical 1 μm for humans). In life, these giant axons are used by the squids to coordinate escape jetting behaviour, enabling the squid to contract its muscles in a split second directly from the brain.

=== Global warming ===
Bigfin reef squids adapt to warmer temperatures by laying more eggs, making them a good indicator species for climate change. In conjunction with their rapid growth rates and short lifespans, bigfin reef squid populations may rise dramatically in response to global warming. Overfishing may also play an important role. In the Gulf of Thailand, the fishing industry has been forced to adapt to the large numbers of bigfin reef squids now present in the area, believed to be the result of overfishing of the squid's natural predators. The Australian scientist George Jackson describes them as "the weeds of the sea."

Warmer waters may also accelerate the squid's expansion into areas in which it was not previously native. Its recent discovery as a Lessepsian migrant in the Mediterranean Sea may be an example.

== See also ==
- Caribbean reef squid
- Aquaculture
- Underwater camouflage and mimicry
- Animal colouration
