= Sepiella japonica =

Conservation status
- Data Deficient (IUCN 3.1)

Scientific classification
- Kingdom: Animalia
- Phylum: Mollusca
- Class: Cephalopoda
- Order: Sepiida
- Family: Sepiidae
- Genus: Sepiella
- Species: S. japonica

Binomial name
- Sepiella japonica M. Sasaki, 1929

Species of cuttlefish

Sepiella japonica, the Japanese spineless cuttlefish, is a species of cuttlefish native to the western Pacific, around China, Japan, and South Korea. It has been an integral part of many seafood fishery industries but was nearly harvested to extinction due to anthropogenic damage to important habitat and overfishing. The conservation of this species has presented numerous complications as their migratory nature complicates typical protection strategies like the establishment of marine protected areas (MPAs). Their development is contingent upon the stops along their migration which has prompted further research to dive deeper into their behavior and environmental requirements and components continue to change as a consequence of climate change.

== Description ==
Sepiella japonica is a member of the Cephalopoda class, in the phylum Mollusca. Cuttlefish, in the order Sepiida, feature a large and comparatively flat mantle cavity which shelters their internal shell called the cuttlebone. Like other cuttlefish species, the cuttlebone is used to regulate the fish's buoyancy by storing gases between their septa dividers. This shell type is characteristic of cuttlefish species but often varies in shape between species. Despite being a member of the invertebrates, the term “spineless” is actually in reference to the morphology of their internal cuttlebone.

Similar to other decapodiformes, they also have 10 limbs, 8 of which are arms, and the remaining two are tentacles lined with suckers for improved utility. Tentacles may be used for initial contact with pray, and the arms are then used to draw the food towards their mouth which is at the center point of all their arms. Their tentacles are lined with suction cups to help them grip onto prey or transfer their spermatophores during mating. Like other cephalopods, cuttlefish also have muscles attached to their mantles called siphons, which help them move to evade predators very quickly.

Cuttlefish also have special pigments lining their body that serve a multitude of functions. These pigments are called chromatophores, and they help cuttlefish to camouflage into their environment, and interact with members of their own species, as well as others. Their ink has been used historically as traditional medicine but also serves the individual in predator evasion or as a stress response.

== History ==
Japanese spineless cuttlefish have been historically very valuable to Asian fishery industries as they were widely abundant and lived short lifespans which helped to replace those that were caught. Their ink has also been very valuable as both an item in traditional medicine, as well as for its antimicrobial and antioxidant properties. Despite their previous abundance, destruction of their major migratory sites, in addition to over harvesting in proximity to their spawning grounds reduced this species to near extinction.

== Habitat ==
Because cuttlefish tend to prefer shallow water habitats, Sepiella japonica is found most often in and around the East China Sea and South China Sea with populations also inhabiting the shallow areas surrounding Japanese islands and South Korea. However, due to the migratory nature of this species, their distribution will vary seasonally. Their migration destinations may shift according to different environmental factors but routinely rely on shallow waters with firm substrate for their spawning grounds, and open water regions for their winter habitats. It is also thought that they migrate in a generation group as hatchlings leave the spawning grounds together and follow the same subsequent developmental stages cohesively.

== Migration ==
Sepiella japonica migrate from deeper water in the winter into shallower habitats for their mating season. It is suggested that this species of cephalopod is particularly sensitive to different environmental factors like salinity and dissolved oxygen, which may contribute towards the motivation behind migrating to such varying environments. Juveniles hatch from their respective egg clusters in their spawning grounds which are often shallow coastal regions (<60m). As they continue to mature and feed, the juveniles will transition into habitats of warmer, saltier water away from the coastline. Fall months are typically periods of high volume feeding in order to initiate a rapid growth period within their development. During the winter season, they will stay in their overwintering habitat which is usually further from shore at deeper depths between 60 and 80m below the surface. Then, after the winter months, the cuttlefish will then migrate into shallower waters to mate and spawn their young.

== Reproduction ==
Most cephalopods, including the near species Sepiella inermis, are gonochoristic, meaning that there are two, defined sexes within a given species. Like most cephalopods, Sepiella japonica are also thought to be semelparous, which means that they only reproduce once in their lifetime and die soon after.

Once reaching sexual maturity, the male cuttlefish will approach the females and perform a courtship display. Once accepted, the males will pass on a packet of sperm, more formally referred to as a spermatophore, into the female's cavity where she may store multiple packets from other males. It is recorded that males may spray a jet of water into the females’ cavity to clear it of competing male's sperm, to ensure the selection of his own sperm for when she lays her eggs. However, some studies have shown that their polyandrous reproductive strategy enables genetic diversity as male cuttlefish compete for their sperm to be used to fertilize a female's egg clutch.

After receiving sufficient courtship, the females will then move on into the egg laying stage. Sepiella japonica, along with many other cuttlefish species, choose to lay their eggs attached to some form of rocky substrate, oftentimes a gorgonian coral found in the shallow spawning grounds. Soon after brooding her eggs, the females will begin aging rapidly into senescence, which is thought to be initiated by their orbital gland.

== Current concerns ==
Despite cephalopods holding a reputation for being highly adaptable to environmental variation, the continued increase in ocean acidification poses a potential concern for Sepiella japonica. This species has demonstrated a considerable sensitivity to a number of environmental factors including salinity, pH, water temperature, and dissolved oxygen content. In addition to a physiological sensitivity to these factors, ocean acidification also threatens the organisms that this species adheres their eggs too. Most of the potential substrates that this species leashes their eggs to are made of calcium carbonate, which become particularly threatened when water acidity increases. This species is also heavily reliant on these coastal regions for their spawning grounds, which means that threats posed to these habitats endanger cuttlefish by extension. Anthropogenic interference can decimate potential spawning grounds, therefore also reducing their capacity to lay eggs.

Currently, there are established marine protected areas (MPAs) along the Chinese coastline near this species spawning grounds to reduce the anthropogenic interruption in the area to best enable the species to thrive. However, because of the migratory nature of the species, only protecting their spawning grounds only helps a stage across their entire life cycle. The specialized protection of their spawning grounds still leaves them vulnerable as they migrate away from the coastal regions into open ocean where they feed in order to grow and mature.
