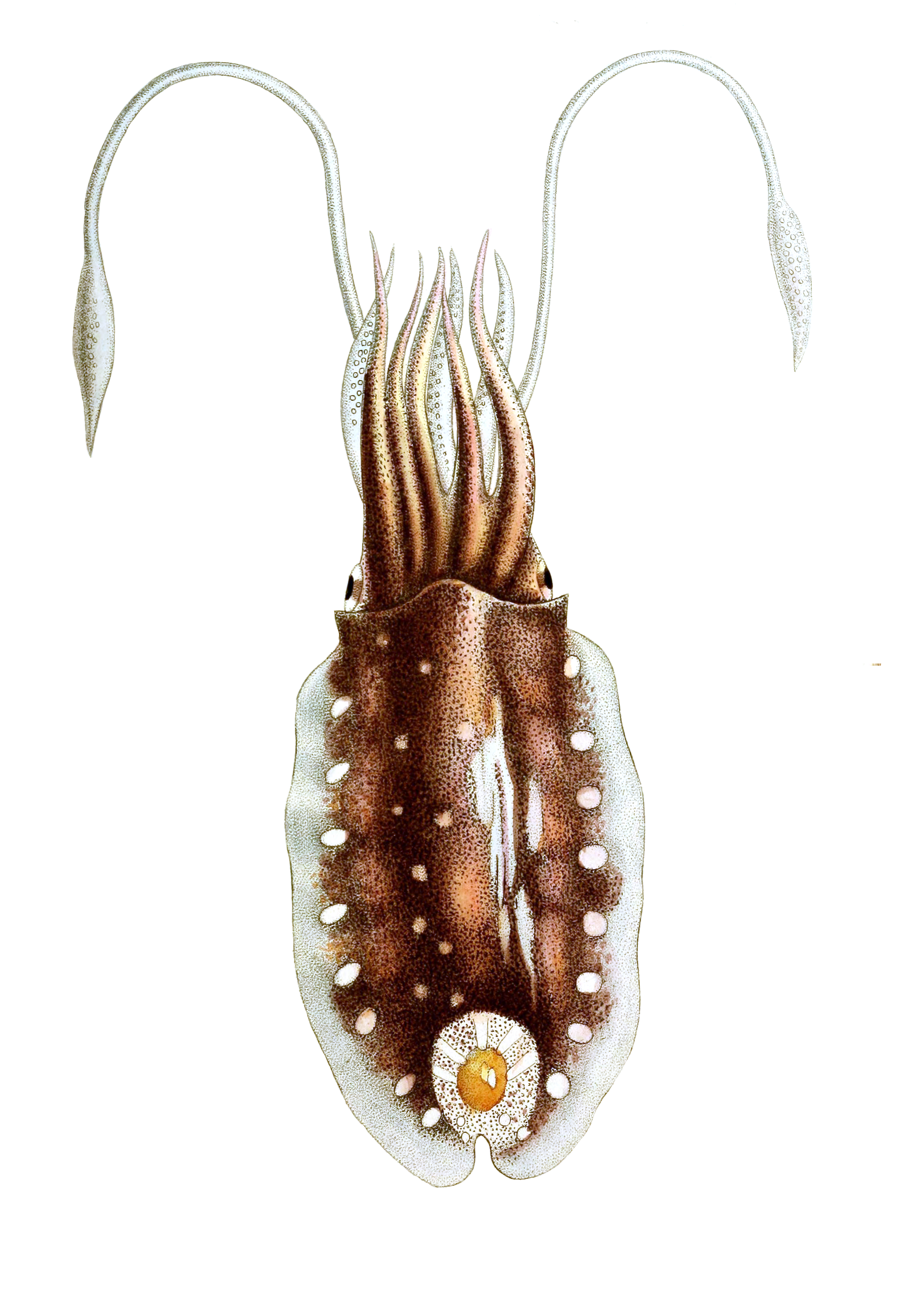

Conservation status
- Data Deficient (IUCN 3.1)

Scientific classification
- Kingdom: Animalia
- Phylum: Mollusca
- Class: Cephalopoda
- Order: Sepiida
- Family: Sepiidae
- Genus: Sepiella
- Species: S. ornata

Binomial name
- Sepiella ornata (Rang, 1837)

Synonyms
- Sepia ornata Rang, 1837

= Sepiella ornata =

Species of cuttlefish

Sepiella ornata, or the ornate cuttlefish, is a species of cuttlefish first described by Sander Rang in 1837 based on a specimen caught in the Gulf of Guinea.

== Description ==
Sepiella ornata has a mantle length of up to 100 millimeters, and a total body length of up to 100 centimeters. It has 10 to 14 suckers on each club (10 to 12 on males and 12 to 14 on females), and a series of spots along dorsal fins, described as either reddish or wine-colored.

== Distribution and habitat ==
Sepiella ornata is found in the east Atlantic ocean along the west coast of Africa, from Cape Blanco in Mauritania to Cape Frio in Namibia, including in Ghana, Namibia (though rarely), Mauritania, Senegal, the Gambia, Guinea-Bissau, and Guinea. It is demersal, with a depth range of 20 to 150 meters, though usually found below 30 meters, and it is most abundant below 50 meters. The species is found between 13 and 16 kilometers offshore. According to Guerra, Gonzalez, Roeleveld, and Jereb it is mostly found on muddy or sandy mud bottoms.

== Reproduction ==
Sepiella ornata has large eggs.

== Interest to fisheries ==
According to Rocha and Cheikh, Sepiella ornata is of potential interest to fisheries. As of 2014, it was mostly caught as bycatch in bottom trawls.
