= Sepiella mangkangunga =

Conservation status
- Least Concern (IUCN 3.1)

Scientific classification
- Kingdom: Animalia
- Phylum: Mollusca
- Class: Cephalopoda
- Order: Sepiida
- Family: Sepiidae
- Genus: Sepiella
- Species: S. mangkangunga

Binomial name
- Sepiella mangkangunga Reid & Lu, 1998

Species of cuttlefish

Sepiella mangkangunga is a species of cuttlefish native to the Indo-Pacific, specifically off the Northern Territory in Australia (12°48′S 130°21′E to 13°14′S 130°57′E). It lives at depths from 1.1 to 3.3 m.

Females are on average slightly larger than males. They grow to 59 and 58 mm in mantle length, respectively.

The type specimen was collected off Stingray Head in the Northern Territory (12°48′S 130°21′E). It is deposited at the Museum and Art Gallery in Darwin.
