= Silvia Maciá =

American marine biologist

- Born: 1972 (age 53–54); Miami, FL
- Occupations: Marine biologist, Professor of Biology
- Spouse: Michael Robinson

Academic background
- Education: Bachelor of Science in Marine Science and Biology, PhD in Marine Biology
- Alma mater: University of Miami Rosenstiel School of Marine and Atmospheric Science
- Thesis: Dissertation research: The effects of sea urchin grazing and drift algal blooms on a subtropical seagrass bed community (1999)

Academic work
- Discipline: Marine Science and Biology, Oceanography, Ecology, Environmental Science, Botany
- Sub-discipline: Research on pipefish mating behavior, seagrass community ecology, coral reef grazing ecology, seagrass restoration
- Website: www.barry.edu/biology/faculty/macia.html

Silvia Maciá (born 1972) is an American marine biologist and professor of biology at Barry University in Miami Shores, FL. Her research interests involves both laboratory and field work addressing pipefish mating behavior, seagrass community ecology, coral reef grazing ecology and seagrass restoration.

Maciá is perhaps best noted for her discovery that Caribbean reef squid (Sepioteuthis sepioidea) can fly. She and her biologist husband Michael Robinson were boating on the north coast of Jamaica when she spotted something fly out of the water. She initially thought they were flying fish but after watching for a few seconds, she realized they were squid.

== Background ==
Maciá has taught a number of courses, including marine biology, oceanography, tropical marine ecosystems, ecology, environmental science and botany. She has published over 20 academic publications, which have been cited over 500 times, resulting in an h-index of 11.

== Selected academic publications ==
- Maciá, S, MP Robinson (2012) Reproductive pattern in the caridean shrimp Gnathophylloides mineri Schmitt (Gnathophyllidae), a symbiont of sea urchins. J. Crustacean Biol. 32: 727-732.
- Maciá, S, MP Robinson (2009) Why be cryptic? Choice of host urchin is not based on camouflage in the caridean shrimp Gnathophylloides mineri. Acta Ethologica 12:105-113.
- Maciá, S. and MP Robinson (2009) Growth rates of the tropical sea urchins Tripneustes ventricosus and Lytechinus variegatus based on natural recruitment events. Caribb. J. Sci. 45(1): 64-68
- Maciá, S, MP Robinson (2008) Habitat-dependent growth in a Caribbean sea urchin Tripneustes ventricosus: the importance of food type. Helgoland Mar. Res. 62(4): 303-308.
- Maciá, S, MP Robinson, A Nalevanko (2007) Experimental dispersal of recovering Diadema antillarum increases grazing intensity and reduces macroalgal abundance on a coral reef. Mar. Ecol. Prog. Ser. 348: 173-182.
- Maciá, S, MP Robinson (2005) Effects of habitat heterogeneity in seagrass beds on grazing patterns of parrotfishes. Mar. Ecol. Prog. Ser. 303: 113-121.
- Maciá, S, MP Robinson, P Craze, R Dalton, and JD Thomas (2004) New observations on airborne jet propulsion (flight) in squid with a review of previous reports. J. Molluscan Studies 70(3): 309-311.
- Prince, JS, WG LeBlanc, and S Maciá (2004) Design and analysis of multiple choice feeding preference data. Oecologia 138(1): 1-4.
- Lirman, D. B Orlando, S Maciá, D Manzello, L Kaufman, P Biber and T Jones (2003) Coral communities of Biscayne Bay, Florida and adjacent offshore areas: Diversity, abundance, distribution, and environmental correlates. Aq. Conserv. 13: 121-135.
- Irlandi, E, B Orlando, S Maciá, P Biber, T Jones, L Kaufman, D Lirman, and E Patterson (2002) The influence of freshwater runoff on biomass, morphometrics, and production of Thalassia testudinum. Aq. Bot. 72(1): 67-78.
- Maciá, S (2000) The role of sea urchin grazing and drift algal blooms in the community ecology of a subtropical seagrass bed. J. Exp. Mar. Biol. Ecol. 246: 53-67.
- Maciá, S and D Lirman (1999) Destruction of Florida Bay seagrasses by a grazing front of sea urchins. Bull. Mar. Sci. 65: 593-601.
