= Sepiella ocellata =

Conservation status
- Data Deficient (IUCN 3.1)

Scientific classification
- Kingdom: Animalia
- Phylum: Mollusca
- Class: Cephalopoda
- Order: Sepiida
- Family: Sepiidae
- Genus: Sepiella
- Species: S. ocellata

Binomial name
- Sepiella ocellata Pfeffer, 1884

Species of cuttlefish

Sepiella ocellata is a species of cuttlefish known only from the type locality off Java. The depth range of this species is unknown. Only a single male specimen has been recorded. The status of S. ocellata is questionable.

Sepiella ocellata grows to 50 mm in mantle length.

The type specimen was collected off Java and is deposited at the Zoologisches Museum in Hamburg.
