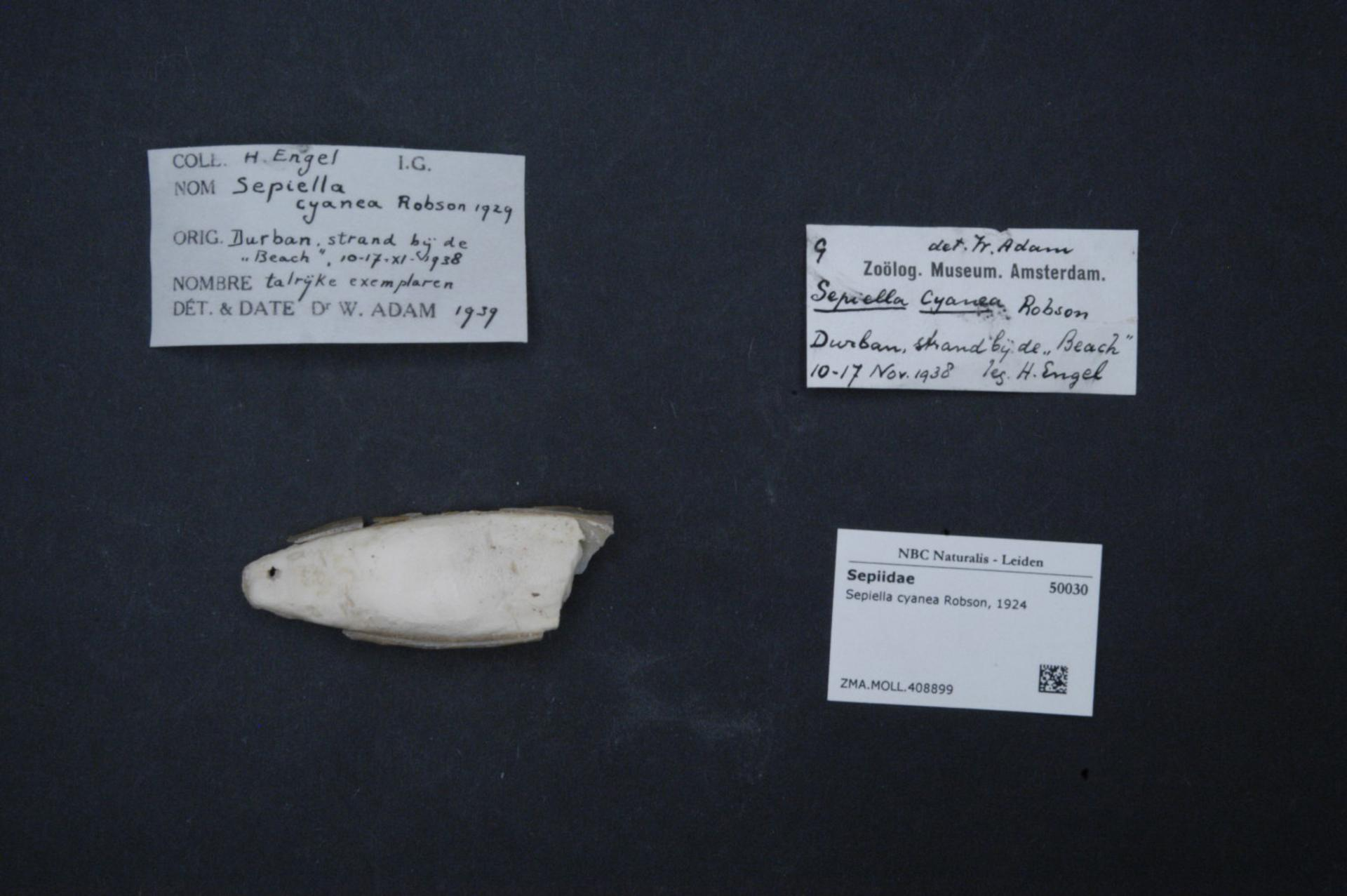
- Sepiella cyanea cuttlebone at Zoölogisch Museum Amsterdam

Conservation status
- Data Deficient (IUCN 3.1)

Scientific classification
- Kingdom: Animalia
- Phylum: Mollusca
- Class: Cephalopoda
- Order: Sepiida
- Family: Sepiidae
- Genus: Sepiella
- Species: S. cyanea

Binomial name
- Sepiella cyanea Robson, 1924

= Sepiella cyanea =

Species of cuttlefish

Sepiella cyanea is a species of cuttlefish native to the southwestern Indian Ocean, from Port Elizabeth and Durban north to central Mozambique (26ºN) and Madagascar. It lives at depths of 13 to 73 m.

Sepiella cyanea grows to 80 mm in mantle length.

The type specimen was collected off Natal, South Africa and is deposited at The Natural History Museum in London.
