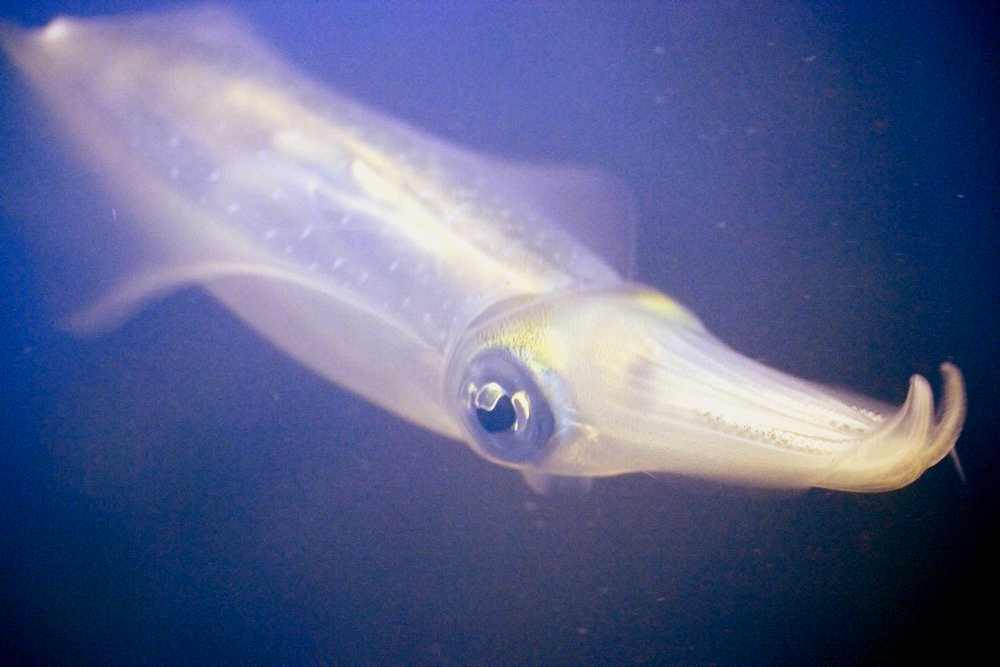
- Sepioteuthis lessoniana

Scientific classification
- Domain: Eukaryota
- Kingdom: Animalia
- Phylum: Mollusca
- Class: Cephalopoda
- Order: Myopsida
- Family: Loliginidae
- Genus: Sepioteuthis; Blainville, 1824

Type species
- Loligo sepioidea Blainville, 1823

Species
- See text

= Sepioteuthis =

Reef squids

Genus of squids

Sepioteuthis, commonly known as reef squids or oval squids, is a genus of pencil squid. Reef squids are easily recognizable by their large rounded fins that extend along almost the entire length of their mantles, giving them a superficial resemblance to cuttlefish.

== Species ==
Three species are currently recognized, though S. australis and S. lessoniana are believed to be cryptic species complexes.

- Sepioteuthis australis, southern reef squid or southern calamary
- Sepioteuthis lessoniana, bigfin reef squid or northern calamary
- Sepioteuthis sepioidea, Caribbean reef squid

An additional species, S. loliginiformis, was described in 1828, but its validity is questionable. However, if the species turns out to be the same as S. australis or S. lessoniana, S. loliginiformis would be the senior synonym and replace the younger name currently in use.
