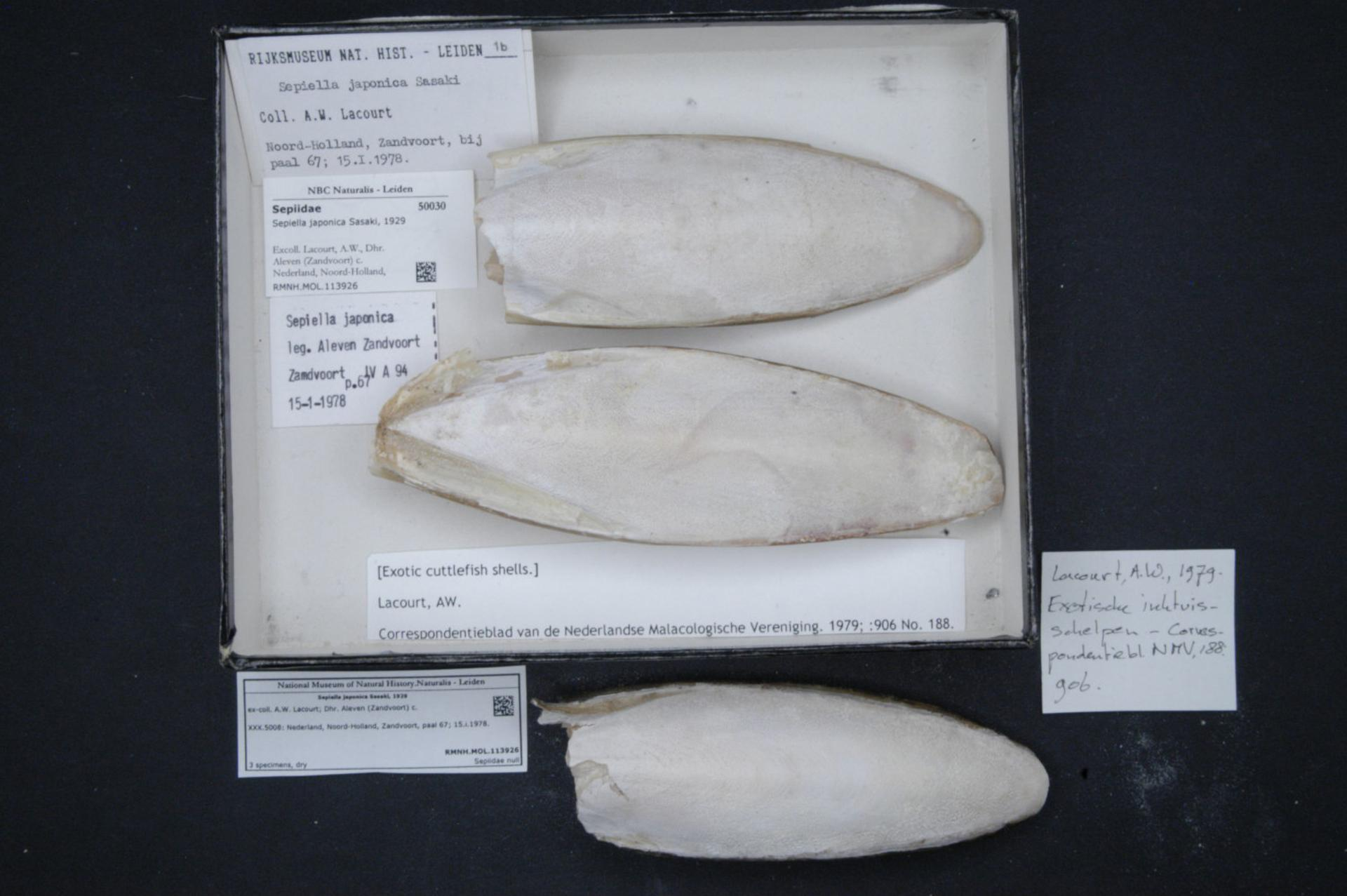
- Sepiella japonica Sasaki, 1929, museum specimen

Scientific classification
- Domain: Eukaryota
- Kingdom: Animalia
- Phylum: Mollusca
- Class: Cephalopoda
- Order: Sepiida
- Family: Sepiidae
- Genus: Sepiella; Gray, 1849

Species
- See text

= Sepiella =

Genus of cuttlefishes

Sepiella is a genus of cuttlefish encompassing around seven species.

== Classification ==
- Genus Sepiella
  - Sepiella cyanea
  - Sepiella inermis, Spineless cuttlefish
  - Sepiella japonica, Japanese spineless cuttlefish
  - Sepiella mangkangunga
  - Sepiella ocellata
  - Sepiella ornata, Ornate cuttlefish
  - Sepiella weberi
