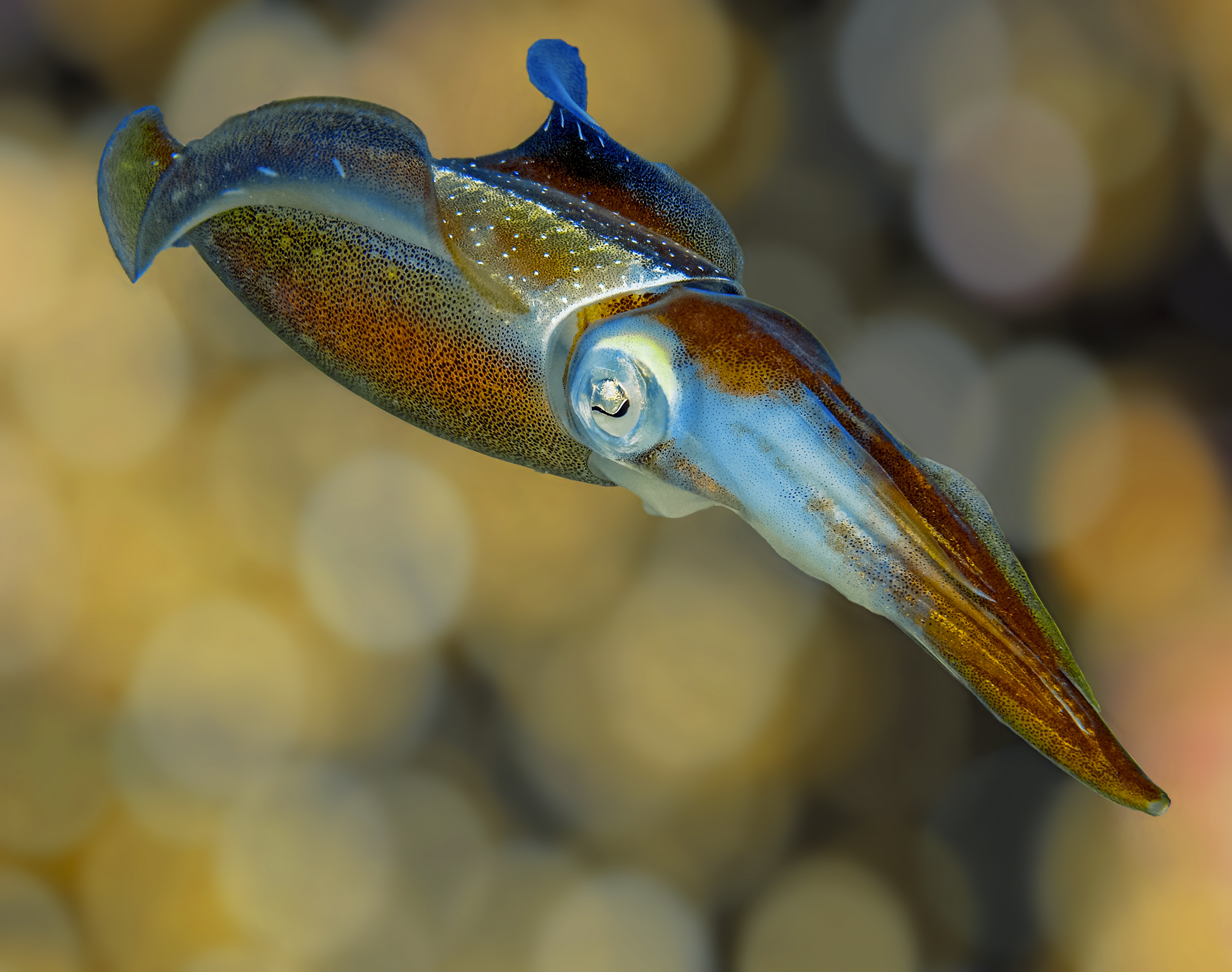

Conservation status
- Least Concern (IUCN 3.1)

Scientific classification
- Kingdom: Animalia
- Phylum: Mollusca
- Class: Cephalopoda
- Order: Myopsida
- Family: Loliginidae
- Genus: Sepioteuthis
- Species: S. sepioidea

Binomial name
- Sepioteuthis sepioidea (Blainville, 1823)

Synonyms
- Loligo sepiodea Blainville, 1823; Sepioteuthis biangutata Rang, 1837; Sepioteuthis sepiodea d'Orbigny, 1839; Sepioteuthis sloani Leach, 1849; Sepioteuthis ovata Gabb, 1868; Sepioteuthis ehrhardti Pfeffer, 1884; Sepioteuthis accidentalis Robson, 1926; Sepia officinalis jurujubai Oliveira, 1940

= Caribbean reef squid =

Species of squid

The Caribbean reef squid (Sepioteuthis sepioidea), commonly called the reef squid, is a species of small, torpedo-shaped squid with undulating fins that extend nearly the entire length of the body, approximately 20 cm (8 in) in length. They are most commonly found in the Caribbean Sea in small schools. As part of the Cephalopod class of Molluscs, these organisms exhibit specific characteristics to help them in their environment, such as tentacles for movement and feeding and color pigments that reflect their behavioral conditions.

Caribbean Reef Squid aka Sepioteuthis sepioidea in the shallows on Bonaire (Caribbean Netherlands) in October 2026.

== History and phylogeny ==
The reef squid is included in the monophyletic family Loliginidae, which houses a discovered twenty-six species. The origin of the family is the geographical Cretaceous period within the Indo-Pacific sea region.

In 2001, marine biologist Silvia Maciá discovered that squid were able to propel themselves up out of the water about 2 m (6.6 ft) and fly approximately 10 m (33 ft) before re-entry; a discovery which led to the identification of six species of flying squid.

== Distribution and habitat ==
The Caribbean reef squid is found throughout the Caribbean Sea as well as off the coast of Florida, commonly in small schools of four to thirty in the shallows associated with reefs.

The habitat of the Reef Squid changes according to the squid's stage of life and size. New hatchlings tend to reside close to the shore in areas from 0.2 to 1 metre (1 to 3 ft) below the surface on or under vegetation. Young small squid typically congregate in shallow turtle grass near islands and remain several centimeters to two meters from the surface to avoid bird predators. Adults venture out into open water and can be found in depths up to 150 m. When mating, adults are found near coral reefs in depths of 1.5 to 8 metres (5 to 26 ft).

The Caribbean reef squid is the only squid species commonly sighted by divers over inshore reefs in the Florida, Bahamas and Caribbean regions. They are also found around Brazilian reef habitats, due to a symbiotic relationship in which the squid protect juvenile fish from open-ocean predators.

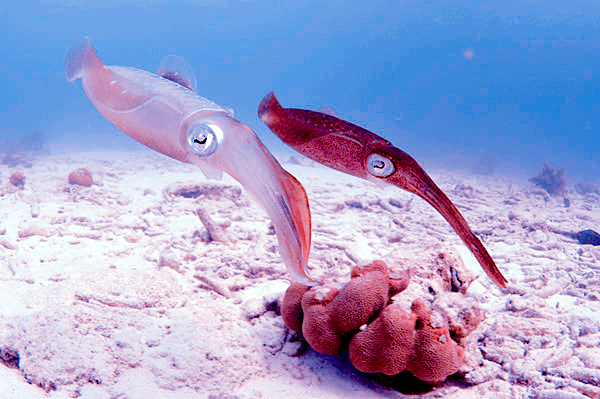
Reef squid, Bonaire

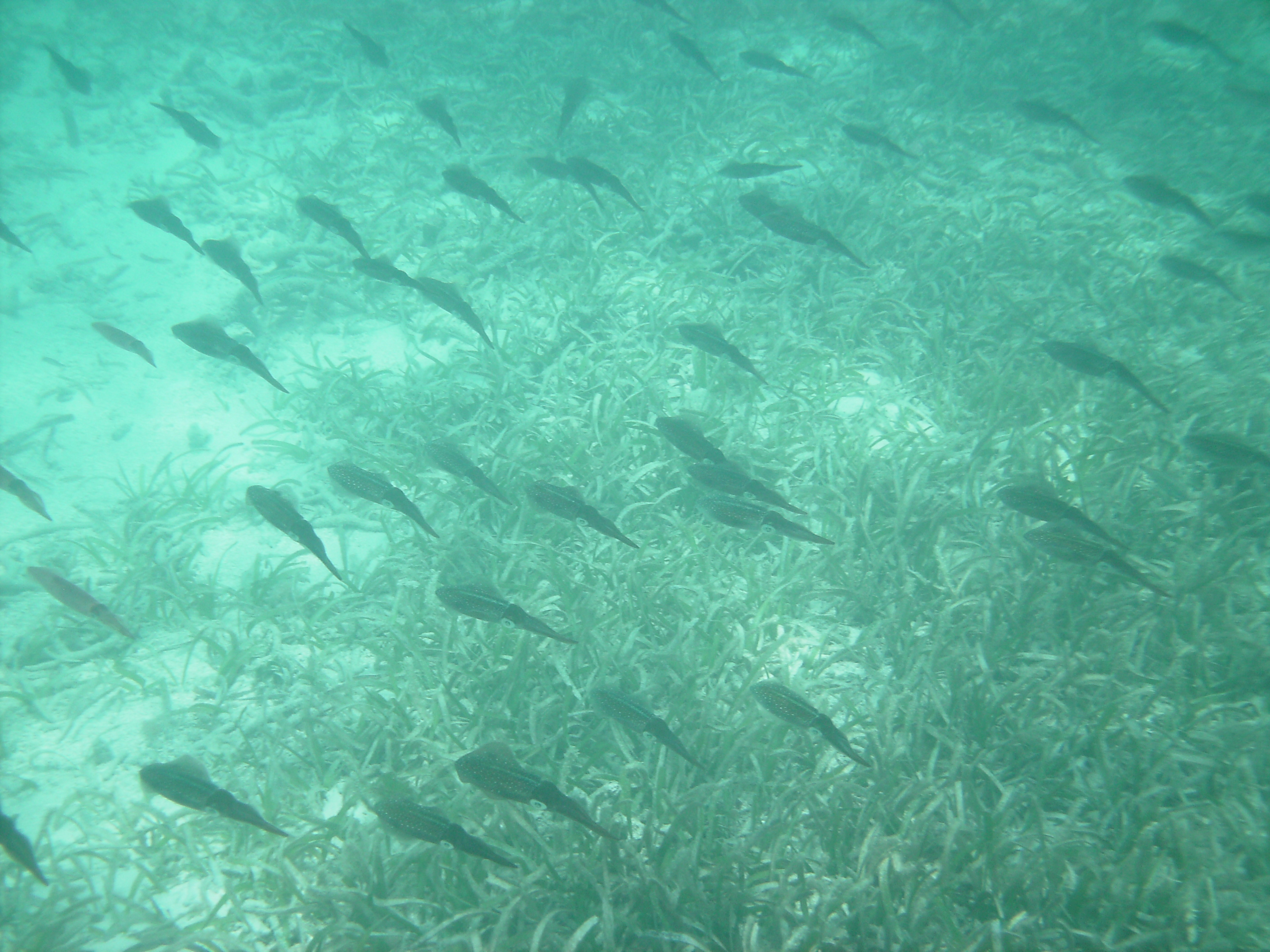
A school in Dry Tortugas National Park, Florida

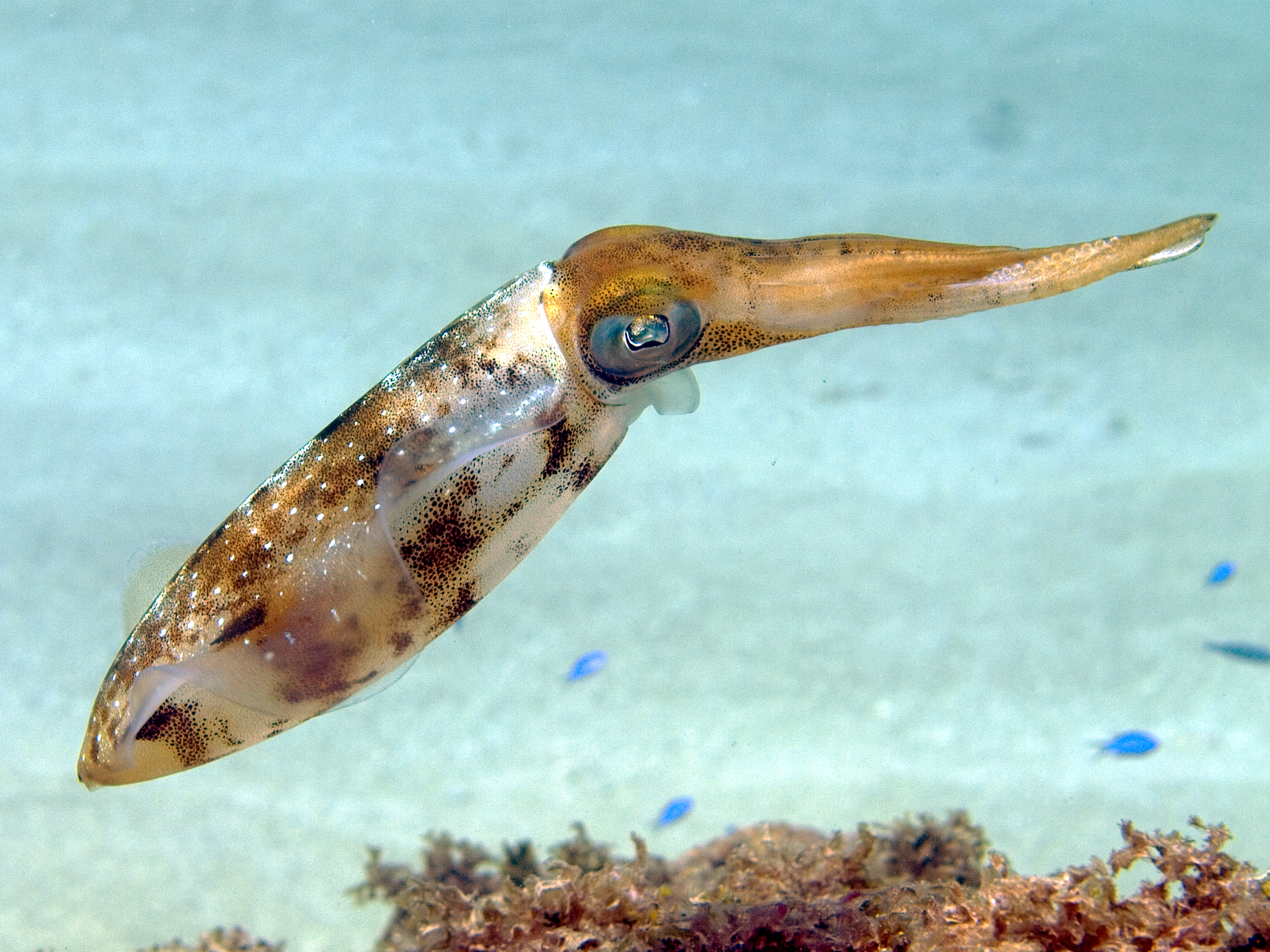
Caribbean reef squid hovering just above seafloor

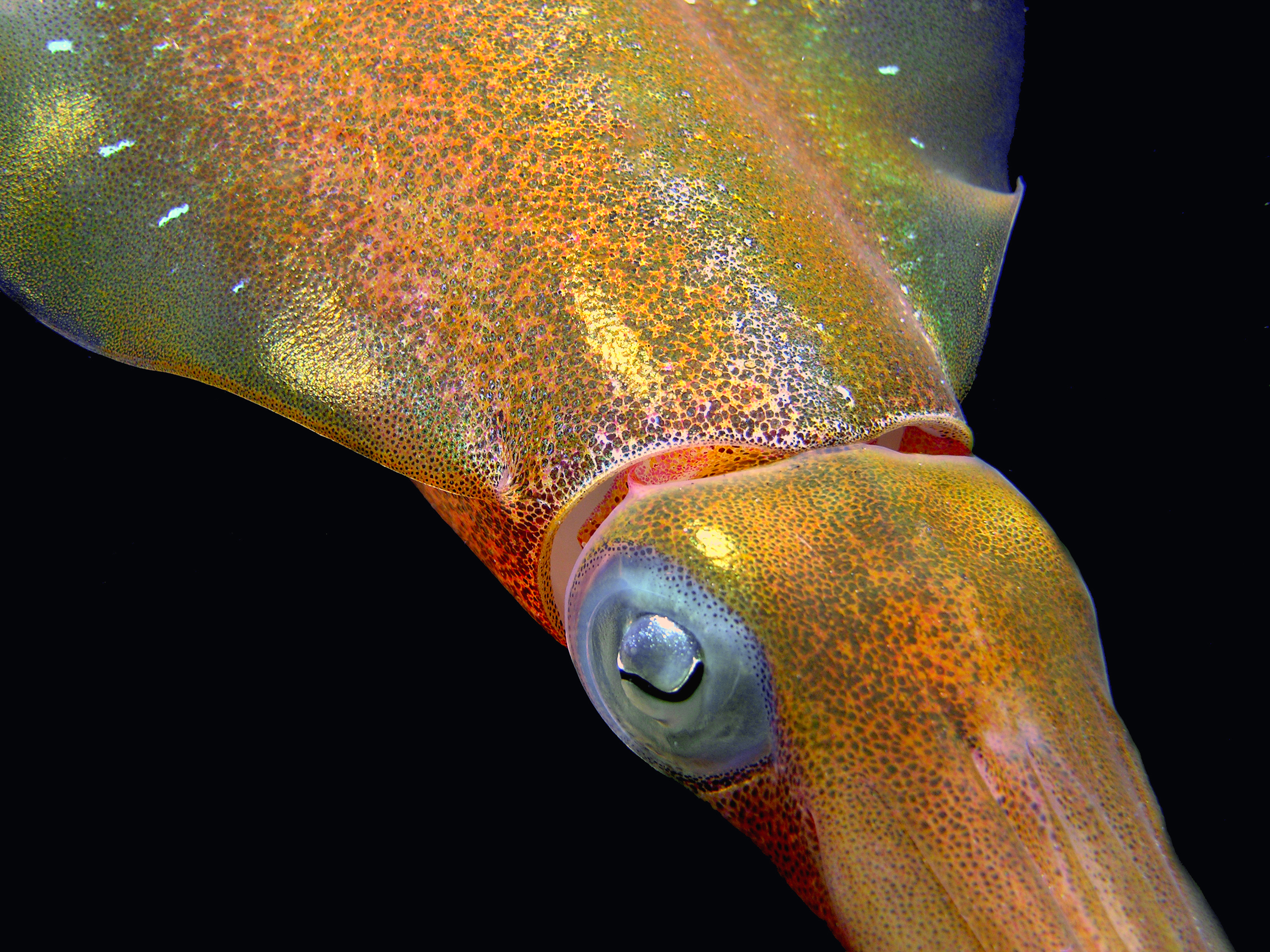
Close-up of a Caribbean reef squid

== Characteristics ==
Like most squid species, reef squid exhibit an asymmetric, horizontal pupil, commonly referred to as W-shaped. Its purpose is currently unknown, though research supports utilization in balancing light within their vision field. This creates evenly visualized images.

Another phenomenon, deemed the "half-and-half" body pattern, is a body morph that occurs during interactions with other cephalopods. One half of the cephalopod's body gets darker than the typical coloration a few minutes after the interaction occurs. This color-change is also observed during the sleeping state. The extended 'quiet state' results in a pale, uniform color compared to the shorter 'active state' including varying colors, textures, and patterns.

== Feeding behavior ==
This species, like most squids, is a voracious eater and typically consumes 30–60% of its body weight daily. Prey is caught using the club-like end of the long tentacles which are then pulled towards the mouth supported by the shorter arms. Like other cephalopods, it has a strong beak which it uses to cut the prey into parts so that the raspy tongue, or radula, can be used to further process the food. It consumes small fish, other molluscs, and crustaceans.

== Communication ==
Caribbean reef squid have been shown to communicate using a variety of color, shape, and texture changes. Squid are capable of rapid changes in skin color and pattern through nervous control of chromatophores. In addition to camouflage and appearing larger in the face of a threat, squids use color, patterns, and flashing to communicate with one another in various courtship rituals. Caribbean reef squid can send one message via color patterns to a squid on their right, while they send another message to a squid on their left.

== Reproduction ==
Like other cephalopods, the Caribbean reef squid is semelparous, dying after reproducing. Females lay their eggs then die immediately after. The males, however, can fertilize many females in a short period of time before they die. Females lay the eggs in well-protected areas scattered around the reefs. After competing with 2-5 other males, the largest male approaches the female and gently strokes her with his tentacles. At first she may indicate her alarm by flashing a distinct pattern, but the male soon calms her by blowing water at her and jetting gently away. He returns repeatedly until the female accepts him, however the pair may continue this dance or courting for up to an hour. The male then attaches a sticky packet of sperm to the female's body. As he reaches out with the sperm packet, he displays a pulsating pattern. The female places the packet in her seminal receptacle, finds appropriate places to lay her eggs in small clusters, and then dies.

During the reproductive process, males get defensive over the females they are courting. A physical display resembling zebra stripes, known as 'saddle-striped,' is used to defend a female from other males in female-male pairings. The female response to this display determines whether mating occurs. Once approved by the female, males lay their spermatophore at the base of the female's tentacles. Only half of the time does this action result in the transfer of the spermatophore to the oviduct for internal fertilization.
