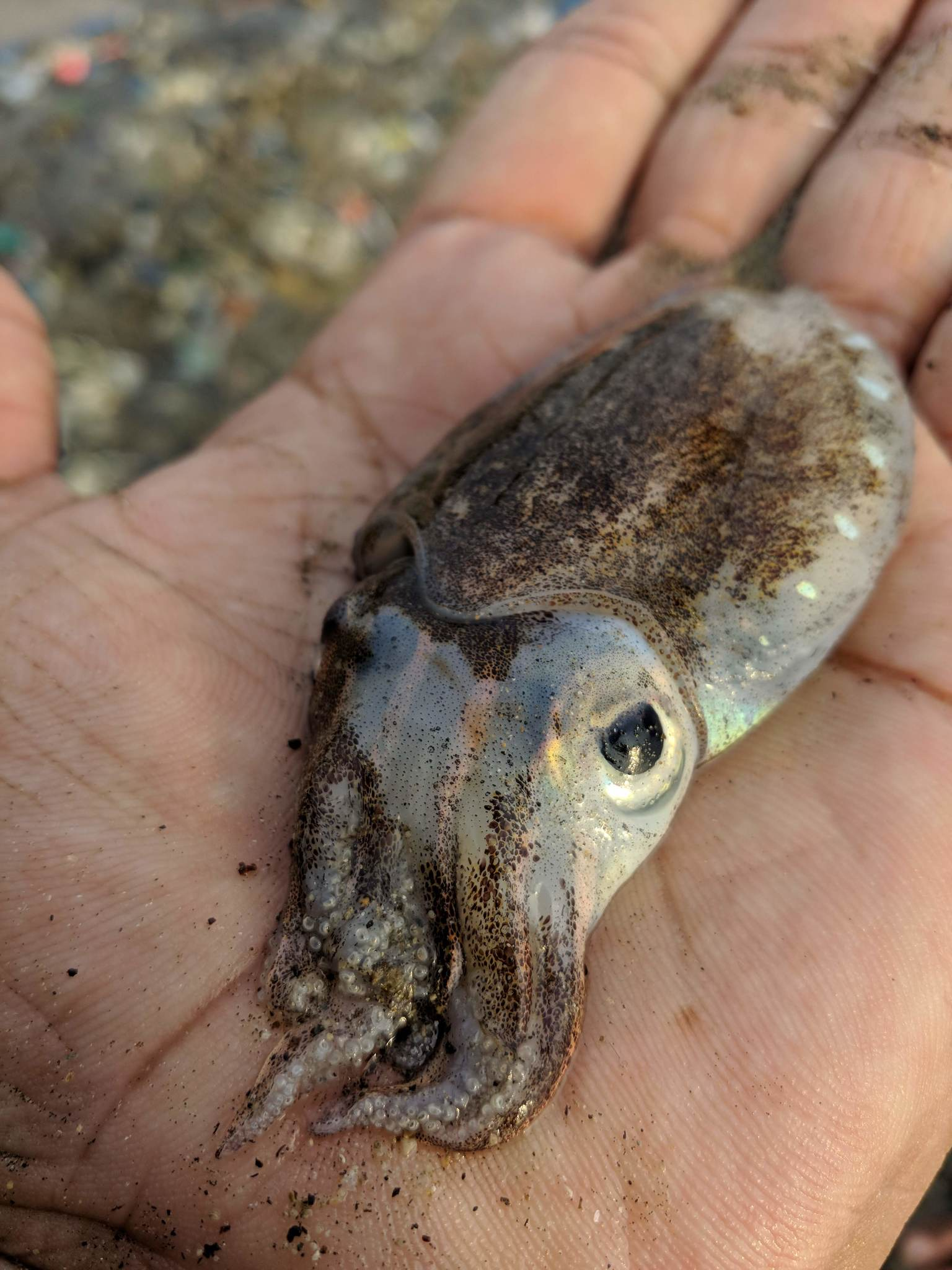

Conservation status
- Data Deficient (IUCN 3.1)

Scientific classification
- Kingdom: Animalia
- Phylum: Mollusca
- Class: Cephalopoda
- Order: Sepiida
- Family: Sepiidae
- Genus: Sepiella
- Species: S. inermis

Binomial name
- Sepiella inermis (Van Hasselt, 1835)

Synonyms
- Diphtherosepion martini Rochebrune, 1884; Sepia affinis Souleyet, 1852; Sepia inermis Van Hasselt, 1835; Sepia microcheirus Gray, 1849; Sepia tourannensis Souleyet, 1852; Sepiella curta Pfeffer, 1884; Sepiella maindroni Rochebrune, 1884

= Sepiella inermis =

Species of cuttlefish

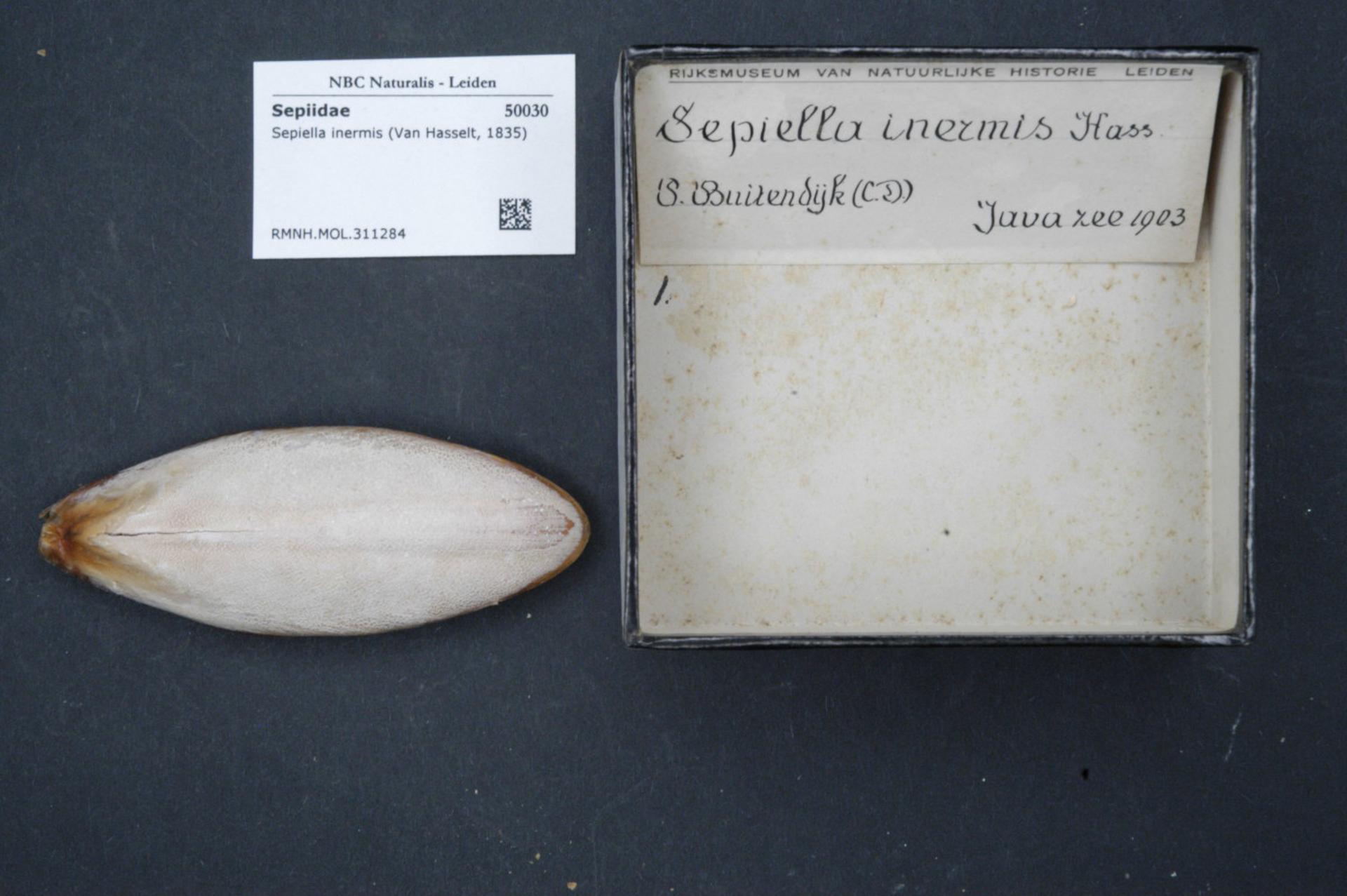

Sepiella inermis is a species of cuttlefish in the family Sepiidae. It is indigenous to the Indo-Pacific region. In this region, S. inermis is an economically important species, and is sold and eaten.

== Description ==
Sepiella inermis is a relatively small species of cuttlefish, with an average mantle length of about 50mm, with a maximum length of about 125mm. It has narrow fins and a moderately small, ovate shell that is white, with a brown and polished horny margin. The dorsal surface of S. inermis ranges in color depending on chromatophores present, ranging from gray-brown to purple, with the ventral surface being light gray or brown. The dorsolateral surface of the mantle is adorned with a series of white spots in both males and females.

== Distribution ==
Sepiella inermis is found throughout the Indo-Pacific region, from shallow water down to depths of about 40m. This species lives primarily benthically.

== Reproduction and development ==
Sepiella inermis spawns throughout the year. Geographic location, environment, and habitat all affect seasonal peaks, causing them to be varied throughout the species. When selecting a mate, males raise a pair of dorsal arms, and display a dark brown color featuring white and orange spots on their fins. Females also display white spots along their fins when consenting to males’ advances. When S. inermis mate, their mating position is head-to-head.

When a female lays eggs, she lays approximately 400, in one to five batches. The female does not eat in between the intervals of batch release. Females prefer to lay their eggs on branch-like substrates. The egg capsules of S. inermis are black in color, dyed by ink from the female, and are round, containing a tip and a stalk. Each capsule contains one egg. The length of the embryonic period can vary, anywhere between 8 and 19 days with an average of about 13 days.

After hatching, hatchlings of S. inermis are morphologically miniature adults that have a planktonic habit. Shortly after hatching, their normal color is dark brown, white, or transparent, and their chromatophores are functional. At around 3 days of age, hatchlings enter the benthic juvenile stage, and use their arms to hold onto the sea bottom. After around 5 days, their tentacles begin to function, and they are able to attack and capture prey.

== Behavior and ecology ==
Sepiella inermis generally displays more active behavior than other sepiid cuttlefish. This species both lives benthically like other cuttlefish, as well as hovers in the water column like a pelagic organism. This species is highly tolerant to fluctuations in the environment, and because of their tendency to benthic-pelagic habitats, requires less territory than pelagic squid of a similar size.

== Economic importance ==
Cuttlefish are becoming an increasingly abundant aspect of the fishing industry worldwide. Although the percentage caught varies depending on geographical location and time of year, they commonly make up a majority of all cephalopod catch. Trawlers are the main means by which cuttlefish are caught, both intentionally and as bycatch. They are exploited all year long, with the percentage catch typically decreasing in summer months because many species spawn in late spring. Even though they are consistently fished, there is still no evidence that implies overexploitation.
