= Socioecology =

Environmental social science

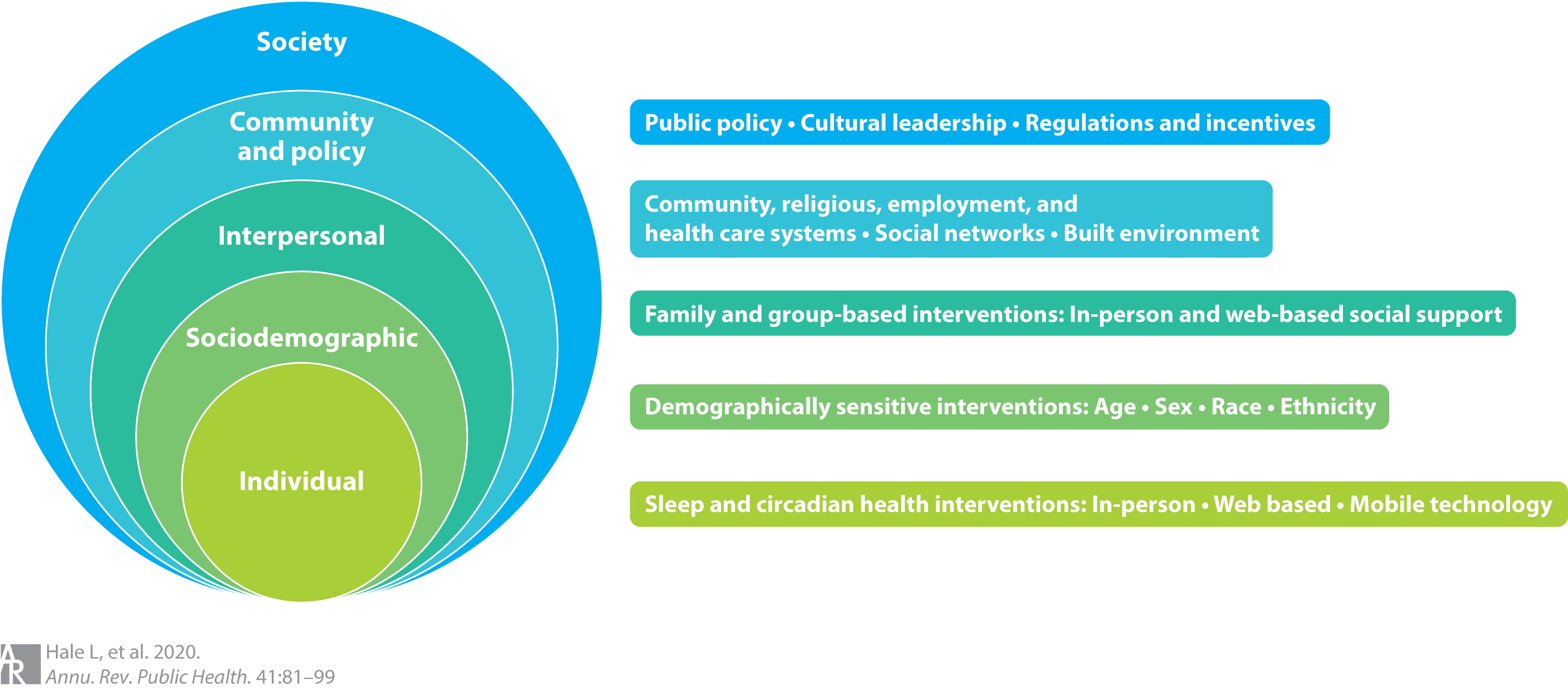
Socioecological model of sleep health, with possible interventions corresponding to different levels.

Socioecology is the scientific study of how social structure and organization are influenced by an organism's environment. Socioecology is primarily related to anthropology, geography, sociology, and ecology. Specifically, the term is used in human ecology, the study of the interaction between humans and their environment.

Socioecological models of human health examine the interaction of many factors, ranging from narrowest (individual behaviors) to broadest (federal policies). The factors of socioecological models consist of individual behaviors, sociodemographic factors (race, education, socioeconomic status), interpersonal factors (romantic, family, and coworker relationships), community factors (physical and social environment), and societal factors (local, state, and federal policies.
