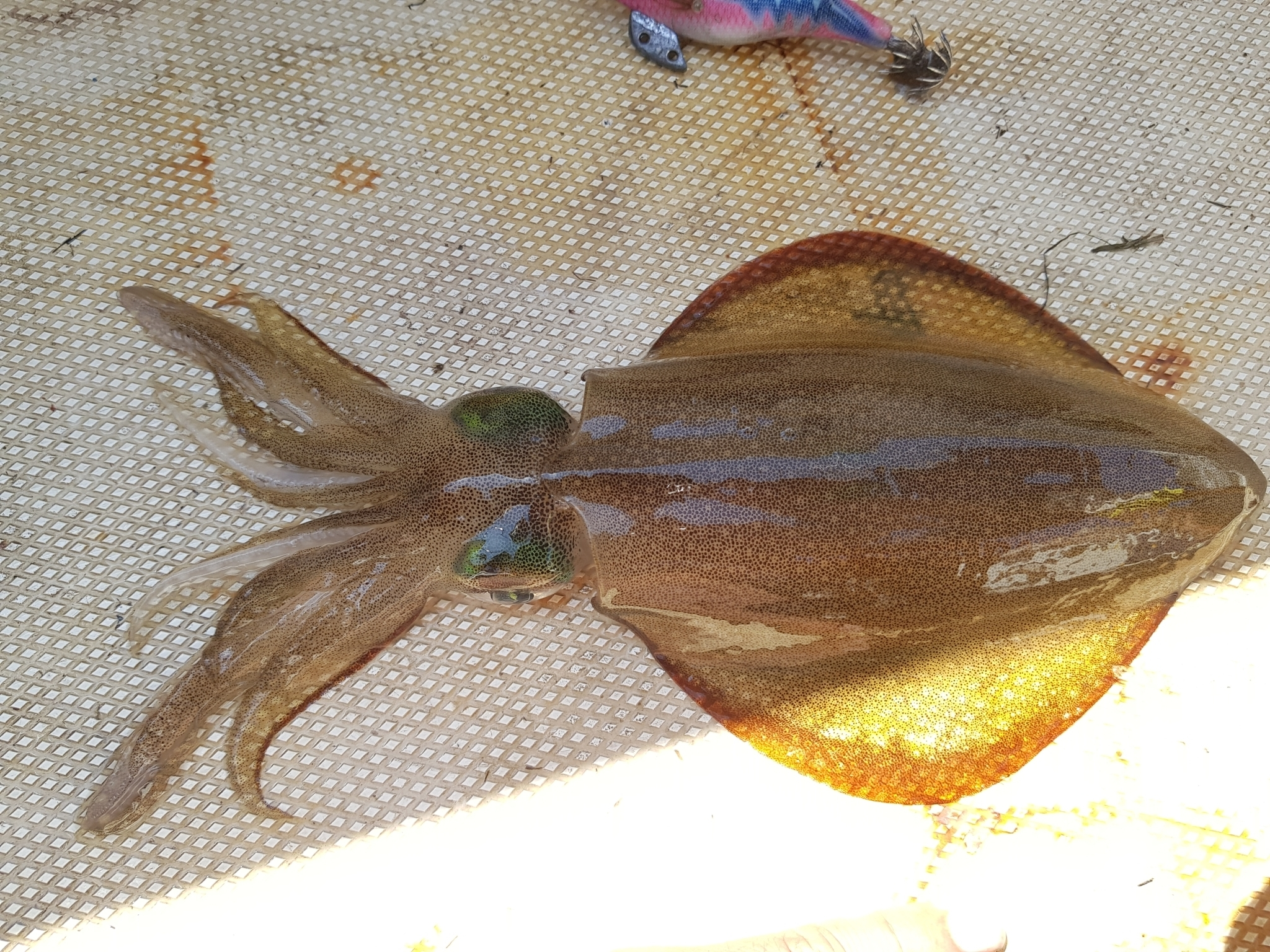

Conservation status
- Least Concern (IUCN 3.1)

Scientific classification
- Kingdom: Animalia
- Phylum: Mollusca
- Class: Cephalopoda
- Order: Myopsida
- Family: Loliginidae
- Genus: Sepioteuthis
- Species: S. australis

Binomial name
- Sepioteuthis australis Quoy & Gaimard, 1832

Synonyms
- Sepia bilineata Quoy & Gaimard, 1832; Sepioteuthis bilineata (Quoy & Gaimard, 1832)

= Sepioteuthis australis =

Species of squid

Sepioteuthis australis, commonly known as the southern calamari or the southern reef squid, is a species of reef squid that is native to oceans off the coast of Australia and New Zealand. This species is caught commercially by trawling, as bycatch in the prawn fishing industry and by recreational anglers.

== Description ==
The maximum length of this squid is about 55 cm (22 in), with a maximum weight of around 5 kg (11 lb). The mantle is robust and tapers bluntly to a point. The eight arms have three rings of suckers with up to thirty hooks, and the two tentacles have long clubs with moderate-sized suckers and further hooks around the suckers. The diamond-shaped fins, which extend for almost the whole length of the mantle are widest in the middle, and are more than half as wide as they are long. The colour of this squid in life is semi-transparent, but if caught and removed from the sea, it will soon change to a uniform orangish-brown or rust colour. The base of the fin has a white or bluish luminescent streak.

== Distribution and habitat ==
The southern reef squid is native to the subtropical Indo-Pacific region where it is found between 16°S and 42°S, and between 112°E and 179°E. It is a benthopelagic species with a depth range between 0 and 10 m (0 and 33 ft). It occurs in southern Australia, its range extending from the Ningaloo Coast in Western Australia along the south coast as far as Tasmania and the Great Barrier Reef, as well as around North Island in New Zealand. Typical habitats include sandy areas, seagrass beds and reefs.

== Ecology ==
This squid is mainly nocturnal and often forms small groups. It feeds on crustaceans and small fish and is itself preyed on by larger fish. If attacked, it can emit a cloud of purple ink and escape while the water is opaque. It is a common species and is of interest to fisheries over much of its range. It is caught commercially by trawling, and is also taken as bycatch in the prawn fishing industry and by recreational anglers using trolled jigs over seagrass meadows.

Breeding takes place at different times of year in different parts of the range; there is typically an annual cycle, with the lifespan being about a year. Courtship occurs with males displaying to females, and males are antagonistic towards other males at this time. While a male is jostling and trying to drive off an interloper, "sneaker" males often get a chance to approach the female and copulate by depositing a spermatophore in her mantle cavity. When the female spawns, the egg strand most commonly contains eggs fertilized by three different males. Each strand typically consists of six to nine eggs and is attached to seaweed or seagrass fronds. Sometimes aggregations of hundreds of eggs occur with many females spawning at one site.
