= Commercial fisheries in the Philippines =

Fisheries beyond 15km of the shore

Commercial fisheries in the Philippines are the fisheries located more than 15 kilometres (9.3 mi) from the coast, which are generally fished with boats larger than 3 gross tons. Commercial fishing occurs throughout the country, targeting both large and small pelagic species, especially tuna and sardines, as well as demersal species.

While fishing in the Philippines has a long history, a distinct commercial fishing industry began to emerge in the 20th century as fishing efforts intensified and new technologies were introduced. Overfishing led to increased competition, and over time coastal waters became restricted to municipal fishing for local use and smaller vessels. Current laws are based on the Fisheries Code of 1998, which distinguishes between the two forms of capture fisheries. Small commercial fishing boats can fish within the outer bounds of municipal fisheries, but only with the permission of that local government.

The Bureau of Fisheries and Aquatic Resources (BFAR) is responsible for managing commercial fisheries resources and maintains a registry of commercial fishing vessels. A large commercial fishing industry works out of southern Mindanao, mostly focused on tuna. Many other vessels are registered in Metro Manila, although their actual fishing grounds are often elsewhere. Philippine-registered tuna fishing vessels sometimes fish outside of Philippine waters in the Pacific, and sometimes Indian, oceans.

== Definition ==
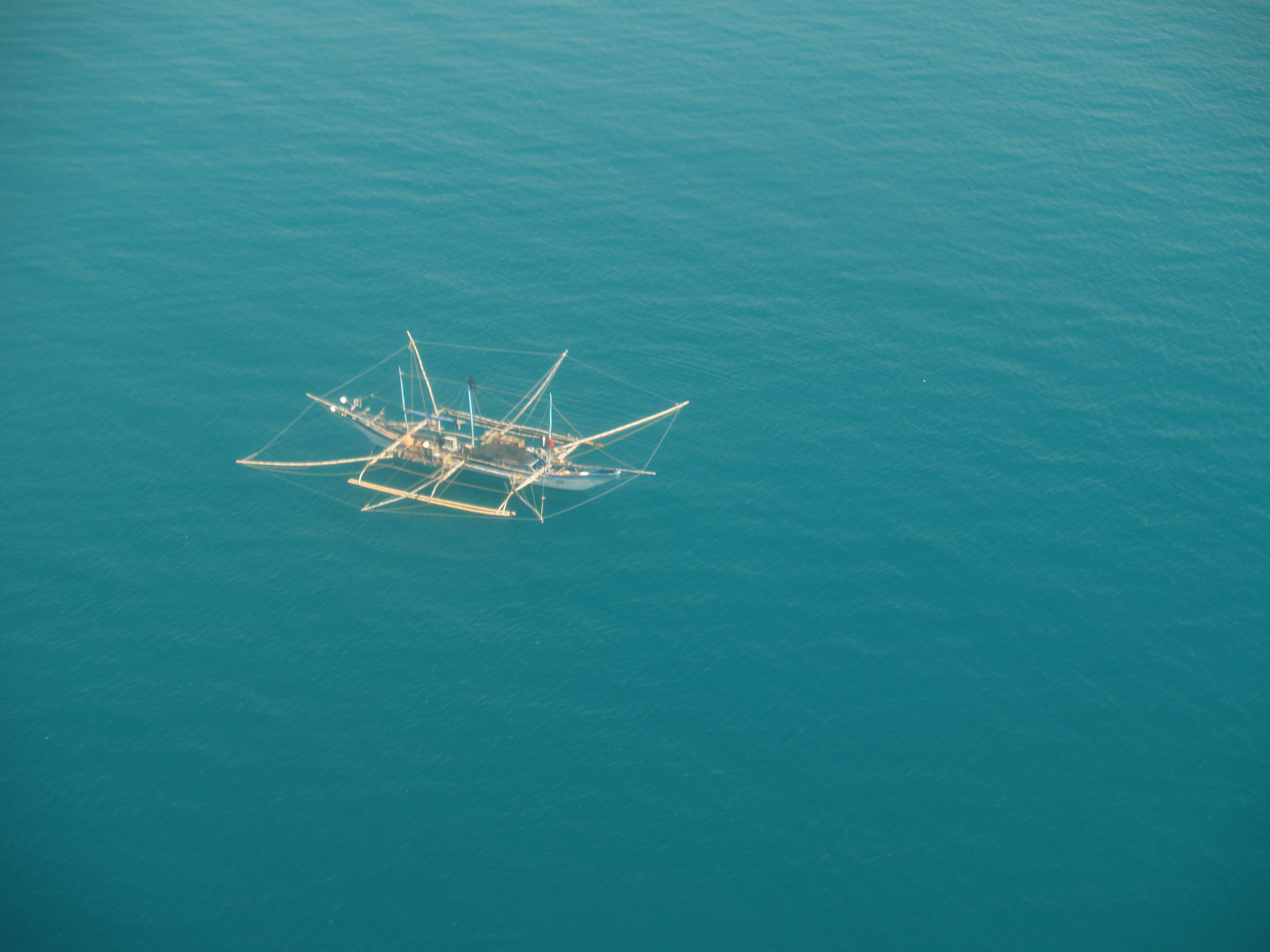
A basnig boat: a bangka equipped with lift nets

Commercial fishing boats are defined through the Philippine Fisheries Code of 1998 (RA 8550), which defines fishing scale by boat size: 3.1 to 20 gross tonnes as small-scale, 20.1 to 150 gross tonnes as medium-scale, and anything larger as large-scale. While some boats, especially large ones, are monohull, the bangka-style boat can be as large as 30 metres (98 ft), and are common due to being relatively cheap, and locally constructed.

Smaller commercial fishing boats fish both in municipal waters where permitted by the municipality and in water further out to sea (more than 15 kilometres (9.3 mi) from the shore), although larger fishing boats are banned from operating close to shore. Common equipment includes trawling nets, push nets, ringnets, lift nets, and Danish seines. Some boats, known as basnig, are specially designed bangka which incorporate lift nets. Medium-sized boats are commonly used for seine fishing, with models including the super hulbot. Large boats range throughout the country, but are often registered in Metro Manila.

== Resources ==
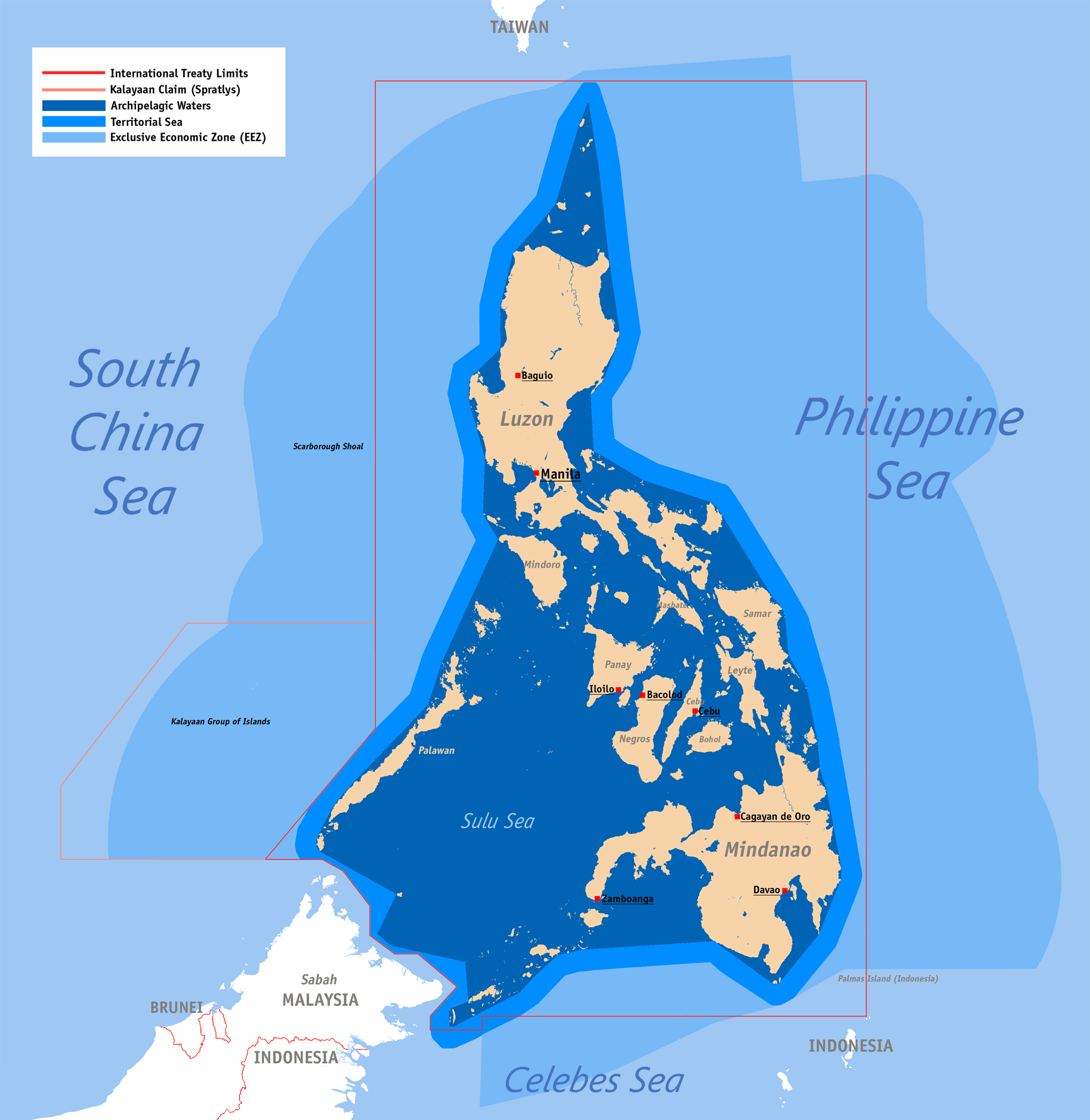
Territorial waters and exclusive economic zone of the Philippines

The Philippines is an Archipelagic state whose over 7,000 islands are surrounded by waters including 2,263,816 square kilometres (874,064 sq mi) of exclusive economic zone and 679,800 square kilometres (262,500 sq mi) of territorial sea. surrounding 36,289 kilometres (22,549 mi) of coasts, of which 184,600 square kilometres (71,300 sq mi) is on continental shelf of 200 metres (660 ft) deep or less, and 27,000 square kilometres (10,000 sq mi) is coral reefs. The value of marine ecosystem services is thought to be around US$966.6 billion. The thousands of islands support a large coastal population. Highly productive due to large amounts of sunlight, and stable and warm temperatures, the country's waters are highly diverse, and are part of the Coral Triangle.

Philippine fisheries include small and large pelagic fisheries, demersal fisheries, and invertebrate fisheries.

=== Large pelagic fish ===
Tuna are the most valuable commercial fish, and the only one caught outside Philippine waters. There are 21 tuna species, 6 of which are fished commercially, and of these 4 are the most important: yellowfin tuna, skipjack tuna, Eastern little tuna, and frigate tuna. Other large pelagic species include marlin, swordfish, and sailfish. In 2022, skipjack made up 50.04% of tuna production. The bigeye tuna and bullet tuna are caught in some quantity, while the albacore tuna, longtail tuna, striped bonito, and Pacific bluefin tuna are caught in minor quantities. Aside from frigate tuna, bullet tuna, and eastern little tuna, these species are usually caught in the deeper ocean.

As of 2019, the Philippine tuna fishing fleet was 91 vessels, the largest national fleet in the western Pacific. Some fishing is carried out in international waters and other national waters for tuna in the Pacific Ocean, and on occasion in the Indian Ocean. Reported tuna catch is thus not all domestic, although the majority is. The reported figure includes both fish caught outside of Philippine waters, and fish landed in the Philippines by foreign-flagged vessels. It is thought around half of skipjack tuna, two-thirds of bigeye tuna, and 87% of yellowfin is fished domestically.

Trolling is used to catch mahi-mahi and marlin.

=== Small pelagic fish ===
The most fished small pelagic species is Bali sardinella, followed by roundscad, bigeye scad, squid, and anchovies. The cheap but nutritious sardine fishery consists of nine species, although there are six main ones: Bali sardinella, Goldstripe sardinella, white sardinella, spotted sardinella, white sardine, and fimbriated sardines. The most fished small pelagic species is Bali sardinella, followed by roundscad, bigeye scad (and others of the Carangidae family), squid, and anchovies (of the Stolephorus genus). Other small pelagics include mackerels of the Rastrelliger genus, round herrings of the Clupeidae family, fusiliers of the Caesionidae family, flying fish, halfbeaks, Indian oil sardines, and Indian mackerel.

While the tuna fishery operates throughout the year, the sardine fishery fluctuates seasonally due to the implementation of closed seasons. From 1991 to 2001, 63% of small pelagic fish caught were from commercial fisheries.

=== Others ===
Commonly fished demersal species are threadfin bream, slipmouths, blue crab, groupers, rabbitfish, spadefish, and catfish. Deep-sea fishing is less common, with the only commonly fished species being Squalidae (dogfish) sharks. These deep-sea fisheries go through boom and bust cycles of perhaps half a decade or so as fishing depletes the population. Their main product is squalene, which is extracted for export. Other deep-sea products caught include fish of the Trichiurus genus, mostly consumed by ethnic Chinese, the manetail snake eel, mostly exported to South Korea, and shrimp including Plesionika species, Heterocarpus sibogae, and Heterocarpus gibbosus, popular among Taiwanese buyers.

The country has 51 swimming crab species, 7 of which are fished for market. The blue crab Portunus pelagicus makes up 90% of all catches. There are significant fisheries for the Acetes shrimp, Penaeus monodon, Penaeus merguiensis, Penaeus semisulcatus, Metapenaeus ensis, and Trachypenaeus fulvus. Squid species harvested include species from the Loliginidae family, such as Uroteuthis bartschi, Uroteuthis duvaucelii, Swordtip squid, Uroteuthis singhalensis, and bigfin reef squid. Also present are the Pharaoh cuttlefish and Sepia esculenta. Octopus species include Amphioctopus membranaceus.

Distinct large major marine fishing grounds include the East, West, and South Sulu Sea, the Sibuyan Sea, the Visayan Sea, the Samar Sea, the Camotes Sea, the Bohol Sea, the Moro Gulf, the Davao Gulf, and the Babuyan Channel. Many large-scale commercial ventures operate out of the Mindanao region, especially in the cities of General Santos and Zamboanga.

== Productivity and methods ==
Commercial marine capture fisheries by species in 2012
| Species | Volume (metric tonnes) | % of total |
|---|---|---|
| Indian oil sardine | 175,159.54 | 16.8 |
| Round scad | 167,152.72 | 16.0 |
| Skipjack tuna | 165,105.27 | 15.8 |
| Yellowfin tuna | 79,508.70 | 7.6 |
| Frigate tuna | 72,572.61 | 7.0 |
| Fimbriated sardine | 48,440.75 | 4.6 |
| Bigeye scad | 42,795.50 | 4.1 |
| Indian mackerel | 36,268.87 | 3.5 |
| Anchovies | 27,150.09 | 2.6 |
| Eastern little tuna | 21,650.28 | 2.1 |
| Slipmouth | 17,672.82 | 1.7 |
| Others | 188,840.00 | 18.1 |
| Total | 1,042,317.88 | 100.0 |

In 2020, commercial capture fisheries produced 35.84% of the Philippine's fisheries output, or 975,205.08 metric tons. As of 2022, commercial fisheries produced 862,686.35 metric tons worth PhP 74.93 billion. The costs involved in capture fisheries are mostly operational, with less than 10% being fixed costs like licenses, taxes, and fees.

Key fishery species are caught by both commercial and municipal fisheries, with commercial fisheries taking 61.2% of the 10 most caught species in 2012. Large commercial fisheries focus on tuna or seasonal mackerel and roundscad. The largest commercial fishery is the tuna fishery, which includes big-eye tuna, eastern little tuna, frigate tuna, skipjack, and yellowfin tuna. This is followed by the sardine market, which includes Bali sardinella, fimbriated sardines, and round herring. The various roundscad species make up the third largest commodity. The sardine market is generally over two-thirds commercial.

As of 2018, 1,856 registered commercial fishing boats targeted small pelagic species such as sardines, 68% of which used ringnet fishing, 19% of which used purse seines, and 13% of which used bagnets. Fishing may be undertaken by a fleet of ships operating in one fishery. Some may handle fishing, often around payao (platforms that act as a fish aggregating devices). A payao is often owned by a commercial operator, although municipal fishermen may be allowed to fish with handlines near a payao, in part to ensure other commercial operators do not fish there. These smaller boats transfer caught fish to another ship for transport to port. Almost half of tuna are caught using seine nets, with ringnets and handline fishing tools capturing about a quarter. Large fishing light attractors known as "superlights" are used to attract species such as the squid Uroteuthis bartschi.

Commercial captures are landed at a mixture of large government ports (run by the Philippine Fisheries Development Authority (PFDA)), local government ports, private ports, and traditional landings. Much is unloaded in the smaller ports, with the seven PFDA-run ports receiving only 16% of caught fish in 2012. By 2022, commercial landings at all PFDA ports had increased to 36.65%. In 2020, there were 5,557 commercial fishing vessels, mostly small- and medium-scale. Half of this fleet operates out of Mindanao, including 1,783 from Region XII (Soccsksargen).

The larger ports are more able to handle complex operations. The most used, in General Santos, received 13.4% of all commercial fishing in 2012, although the port in Navotas has more piers. Foreign fishing vessels also bring fish to General Santos and Davao City. General Santos is especially important for the commercial tuna fishery. Zamboanga City is the major port for sardine commercial fisheries, with the Zamboanga Peninsula region receiving 46% of sardine catch. The six most significant sardine fisheries are the Ragay Gulf-Ticao Pass-San Bernardino Strait area, the Bohol Sea, the East Sulu Sea and Sulu Archipelago, the Visayan Sea, the Moro Gulf and its associated Illana Bay, and Sibuguey Bay. Foreign vessel tuna transshipment is only permitted at the Davao port.

== Impact ==
The increase in commercial fishing and the collapse of municipal fishing have contributed to malnourishment, and for species where both fisheries compete, more are now caught by the commercial sector. The average price of many species has increased over time. Commercial roundscad production has declined since 2003 due to overexploitation. Prices have risen in turn, and roundscad imports have taken place on and off since 2001 to supplement domestic production. Commercial catches for Barli sardinella, Indian mackerel, and Indo-pacific mackerel are decreasing, and the commercial squid industry has also seen declining production.

The development of more productive fisheries created social stratification, with commercial fishing boat owners of a higher class than their employed laborers. Commercial fishing operations benefit from subsidies and economies of scale. While commercial fishers are meant to fish only outside of municipal waters (15 kilometres (9.3 mi) from the shore), there are some conflicts between municipal and commercial fishers. Within a fishery, a small number of commercial boats owned by a small number of households can capture a lopsided amount of the available catch than the larger number of small-scale fisherfolk in the same area, and make greater profit from each catch. Large boats fishing the same payao as smaller boats may sometimes share a small amount of their catch.

The number of individuals working in commercial fisheries is likely undercounted. Many fisherfolk participate in both municipal and commercial fishing, and are counted only as municipal fishers. It is possible that commercial fisheries may employ as much or more people than aquaculture. While the commercial fishing fleet expanded from around 2,100 boats in the 1960s to 7,442 in 2019, modern boats hire a crew about the quarter of the size than they did in the 1960s. Most commercial fishery employment is due to the tuna industry, centered in General Santos. This includes fishing, transport processing, canning, and export. Sardine fisherfolk usually find other jobs during the roughly 3 month closed season, and are return to the same job at the start of the fishing season. These jobs are often paid by volume rather than as a regular salary. While the closure means those in the industry do not earn fishing income for three months, the closure around the Zamboanga Peninsula has seen some incomes increase during the rest of the year. Data regarding employment in commercial roundscad fisheries is sparse.

Socioeconomic challenges have occurred as decreasing incomes and inequitable resource access have exacerbated poverty and created resource conflicts. Municipal and commercial fisheries often compete for the same fish stocks. Commercial fisheries illegally operating in municipal waters have reduced catches in many coastal areas. Overfishing affects all commonly fished species. The amount of fish caught often exceeds maximum sustainable yields. Fishing vessels have had to move further out to sea as nearshore fisheries became depleted. The overexploitation of demersal fisheries through trawling has occurred since at least the 1960s, with some stocks now almost wiped out. In addition to an overall loss of up to 90% of overall biomass, demersal ecosystems have also seen their species composition altered. Trawl catch per hour has declined over time. In total, perhaps 75% of all fisheries are depleted.

Over time, the percentage of fish caught that are larger species has decreased. Squid have also been widely caught in juvenile stages. The introduction of payao, while increasing overall tuna catch, increased the catch of juvenile tuna, with some locations seeing 90% of catch being under a year old. This has affected tuna migration and feeding behaviors. In some areas, juveniles are deliberately caught, a process which not only weakens populations but can cause considerable by-catch. Perhaps 25-30% of overall catch is lost during processing, with a key reason being a lack of cold storage facilities in the commercial fishing sector.

== Management ==
Fishing is expressly meant to be managed through the precautionary principle to ensure ecosystem sustainability. Under the Constitution of the Philippines, marine resources are intended to be used exclusively by Filipinos. Laws to manage fisheries include the Republic Act (RA) 10654 amending the Fisheries Code of 1998 (RA 8550) which defines the role of the Bureau of Fisheries and Aquatic Resources (BFAR) in non-municipal waters, and the Agriculture and Fisheries Modernization Act of 1997 (RA 8435), which calls for the development of the fisheries sector to ensure food availability, create economies of scale, and create value-added products. The 1992 National Integrated and Protected Areas System (NIPAS) Act regulates national protected areas.

RA 8550 forms the basis of current fisheries law, replacing all prior laws that might contradict it. The primary goal of this act was food security, and its balance of ecosystem protection and fishing allowance was intended to achieve long-term sustainability. Representing the private sector is the government-funded National Agricultural and Fisheries Council. Other relevant acts include Fisheries Administrative Order No. 155. Regulating the use of fine-meshed nets in fishing (amended by Fisheries Administrative Order No. 155-1), and Fisheries Administrative Order No. 198. Rules and Regulations on Commercial Fishing (amended by Fisheries Administrative Order No. 198-1 for the registration and licensing of commercial vessels, gears, and workers)

BFAR is responsible for managing fisheries resources outside of municipal waters, which it does through the issuance of Fisheries Administrative Orders (FAOs). BFAR has an office in each region, who send data and information to the central office. BFAR licenses commercial fishing vessels for fishing in national and international waters, with new vessels being registered at the central office and renewals being processed at regional offices. Only ships larger than 20 GT are required to have GPS tracking and satellite responders, although even this is not well enforced. BFAR also produces Fisheries Development Plans. Ports can be managed by the Philippine Ports Authority or by the local government in which they are situated.

Management tools included within the Fisheries Code of 1998 include harvest limits, vessel monitoring, compliance and penalty measures, fishing gear registration, and catch documentation. Other laws and ordinances delivered through means such as Fishery Administrative Orders, Presidential Decrees, and Letters of Instruction include those affecting technology (gear) legality and regulation, spatial restrictions, temporal restrictions, and commodity-specific regulations. Most management is area-based or temporal, limiting all operations within a certain space and/or timeframe, or regulated by species. Restrictions on gear can include regulations on fishing net mesh size, fish hook size, fishing light attractor strength, and bans on fishing methods like trawling. There are minimum mesh sizes for different species, ranging from 1.9 cm (0.75 in) to 3.5 cm (1.4 in).

Closed seasons for specific species are enabled by the Philippine Fisheries Code. A November 15 to March 15 closed season for sardines, herring, and mackerel in parts of the Visayan Sea was mandated by Fisheries Administrative Order 167 in 1989. Enforcement only became significant in 2012, following a 24% decline in catch from 2010 to 2011. The November to March period coincides with the spawning period of these species. A closed season was established near the Zamboanga Peninsula (the East Sulu Sea, Basilan Strait, and Sibuguey Bay) in 2011 through joint Administrative Order No. 1 of the Department of Agriculture and the Department of the Interior and Local Government. The closure in Zamboanga has seen catches increase, however there is so far no evidence for the impact of the closure in the Visayan Sea. Sardine conservation from December 1 to March 1 was reaffirmed in BFAR Administrative Circular 255 in 2014. Also in 2014, joint DA-DILG Administrative Order 2 established a June 1 to August 31 closed season in the Davao Gulf to protect small pelagic species. In 2015, a closed season was implemented to product roundscad around the Calamian Islands from November 1 to January 31 through joint DA-DILG Administrative Order 1. From December 2011 to February 2012, the fishing of Sardinella was banned. Species-level restrictions may also be more nuanced, for example banning the capture of full-sized breeding milkfish. The establishment of closed seasons helps conserve target populations but can also disrupt livelihoods. The closure in the Davao Gulf is specifically targeted at commercial fishing, with employees of commercial ships permitted to fish in smaller vessels during the closure period.

Philippine waters are divided into 12 Fisheries Management Areas (FMAs), plus a special fisheries management area covering parts of Benham Rise. This system allows for regional differentiation in fishing rules and regulations. Each area is expected to have its own management body and scientific advisory group, which will prepare a Fisheries Management Area Plan that is responsive to its particular needs. In addition to creating more tailored sustainability plans, the FMAs are intended to improve governance and the enforcement of fishery laws and regulations.

Labor standards are set by the Department of Labor and Employment, although operators do not always comply with requirements. Many employees are unaware of the legal framework and their labor rights. In some studies, it has been found that many employees are not paid the minimum wage. There is also a significant difference in the average income of men and women in tuna canneries.

=== Implementation and enforcement ===
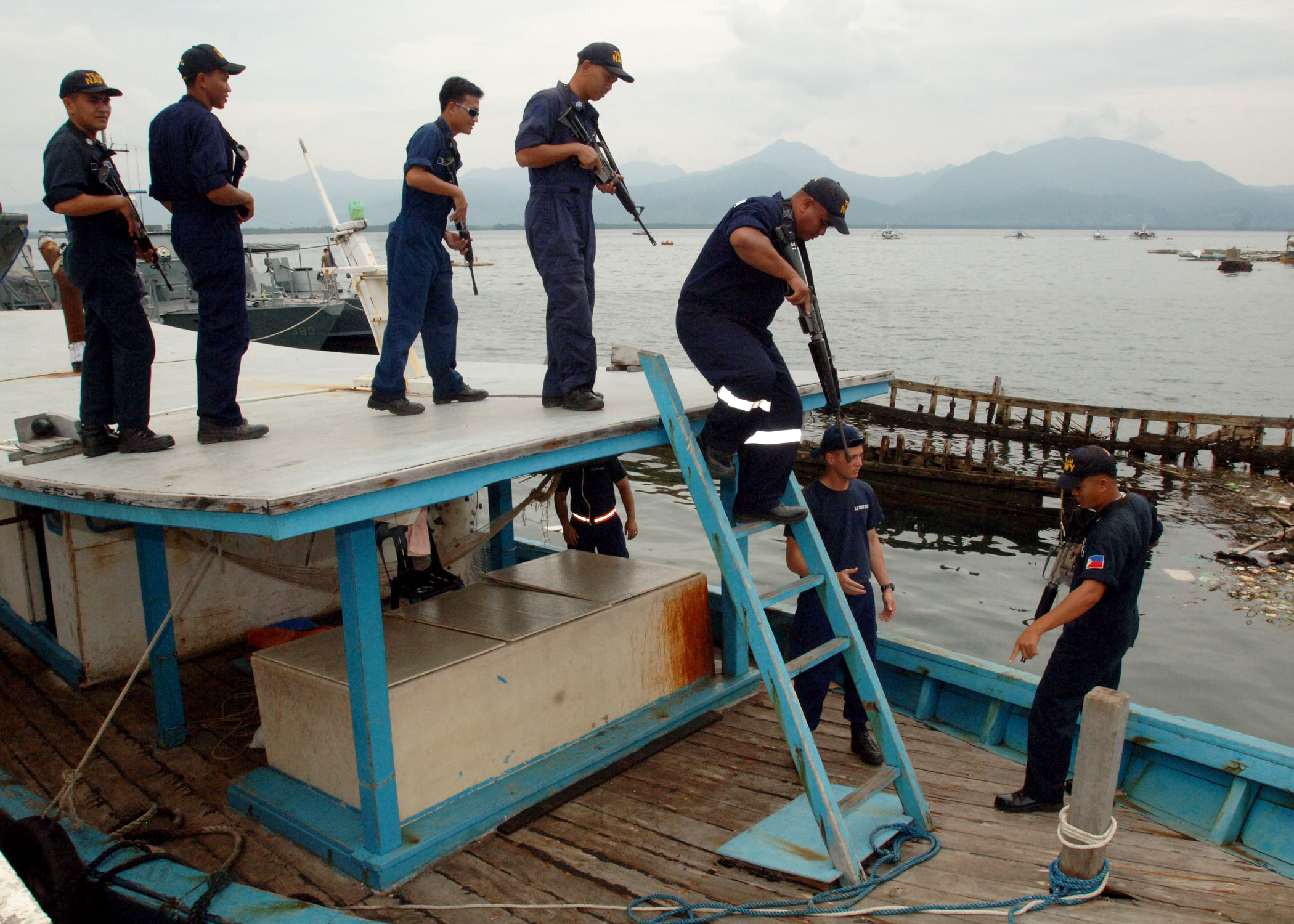
Philippine Navy sailors practicing boarding a fishing ship

The enforcement of laws is shared between many local and national bodies. Effective fisheries management remains a challenge due to the many interlocking factors affecting fisheries, and diverse bodies responsible for enforcement. Boats registered as commercial vessels may not be large enough or properly equipped to fish those waters, leading to unprevented illegal fishing in municipal waters. Philippine environmental law is often regarded as very high quality while facing a consistent challenge in implementation and enforcement. The prevention of illegal, unreported, and unregulated fishing (IUU) is well established within fisheries legislation, being the key focus of the Philippine Fisheries Code of 1998 (fully named "An Act to Prevent, Deter and Eliminate Illegal, Unreported and Unregulated Fishing"). BFAR tracks fishery patrols, apprehensions, and fines related to IUU fishing. It is difficult to get definite data on the impact of IUU fishing, but it is estimated it may affect up to 27-40% of marine capture fisheries. Around 274,000-422,000 metric tons are estimated to be caught but unreported. An estimated 1,600-2,700 commercial fishing vessels are thought to be either unregistered or registered as municipal fishing vessels.

BFAR organizes its response to IUU through a Fisheries Law Enforcement Operations Action Plan, although there is no centralized record of patrol data. From 2015 to 2017 BFAR filed 1,026 cases nationally, with the Eastern Visayas seeing the most cases (178). Overall, only 30 related to fishing with illegal chemicals or explosives, and only 5 related to poaching. Most cases were related to incidents within municipal fisheries, or areas with closed seasons. The Philippine Coast Guard and Philippine Navy are also involved in some monitoring and enforcement activities. The institutional setup creates overlapping rules, regulations, and areas of responsibility. These may complicate some implementation and enforcement efforts, however, they also provide multiple avenues for enforcement. A Vessel Monitoring System has been put in place for commercial vessels whose requirements include hourly location transmissions and electronic catch reports detailing species, volume, and catch location.

=== International cooperation ===
The Philippines ratified the United Nations Convention on the Law of the Sea in 1984, and is also party to the United Nations Fish Stocks Agreement, the FAO Compliance Agreement, the Convention on Biological Diversity, CITES, the Convention on the Conservation of Migratory Species of Wild Animals, some World Trade Organization agreements (such as the General Agreement on Tariffs and Trade), and the Port State Measures Agreement. Such international treaties ratified by the Philippine Congress become part of Philippine law. The Philippines is a member of the Western and Central Pacific Fisheries Commission, the Indian Ocean Tuna Commission, the International Commission for the Conservation of Atlantic Tunas, and the Coral Triangle Initiative.

The Philippines is a cooperating non-member of the Commission for the Conservation of Southern Bluefin Tuna. Bilateral fisheries cooperation efforts have been undertaken with Papua New Guinea, Vietnam, Indonesia, and Thailand. The Philippines engages in multilateral talks within ASEAN, the Asia-Pacific Fishery Commission, the Coral Triangle Initiative, the Asia-Pacific Economic Cooperation, and with the parties of the Nauru Agreement. Research and management cooperation is undertaken with nearby states, including Indonesia, Malaysia, and Vietnam.

=== Threats ===
Climate change is likely to damage the country's fisheries, slowing the growth of the industry compared to current conditions. Its effect is likely to differ between species, for example heavily impacting anchovies and tuna. It is also expected to decrease potential income among those who might purchase fish. Typhoons and other tropical storms cause direct damage to many fisherfolk, as well as to communal infrastructure such as ports.

Disputes with China have reduced the ability of Filipino fisherfolk to access fisheries in the South China Sea. There have also been issues with the illegal fishing of foreign vessels in Philippine waters, including vessels from China, Indonesia, and Taiwan.

== History ==
=== Early history ===
What is now the Philippines has a long history of coastal fishing communities, with folklore referencing relationships with fish and fishing. During Spanish rule the Spanish Law of Waters was passed in 1866 which gave control of all coastal resources to the Manila authorities, from whom they could be leased for use. However, for most resources, there was no management, and so exploitation was effectively unrestricted. Chinese immigration during this period introduced new fishing equipment such as Salambáw nets that allowed for larger catches to supply growing urban populations. At the end of the 19th century, sapyaw/sapiao nets began to spread, and other new net types followed.

A growing population during American rule saw demand for fish increase. Beam trawling was introduced by Japanese fishermen in the early 20th century. This increase in productivity and increased demand led to the development of larger towns whose economy was based upon fishing. The Fisheries Act of 1932 (Act 4003) restricted fishing access to American and Filipino companies, and created the concept of municipal waters, which reached 3 nautical miles (5.6 km; 3.5 mi) from the shore, within which only municipal governments could create fish ponds and corrals, catch milkfish fry, and license ships smaller than 3 tons. Larger ships were licensed by the Secretary of Agriculture and Natural Resources. The 1932 law was the introduction of the concepts of registration and licensing.

=== Technological development and commercial expansion ===
After World War II, the Philippines led the modernization of Southeast Asian fisheries. At this time, municipal fisheries were 150% larger than commercial ones. The rapid development and adoption of new technology greatly increased fishery intensity. Active gear, such as trawl nets, began to supplant passive gear, such as fish corrals. Trawl nets increased in efficiency. Motorboats began to spread, increasing range and mobility. In capture fisheries, otter trawlers began to be widely adopted, and in the 1960s purse seines became more common.

By the mid-1960s, production was double what it was in 1951. Overall, there was an almost sixfold increase in fishing effort from this period to the mid-1980s. Some fisheries in Manila Bay were likely already close to being overfished during the 1950s. The technological development of the industry benefited existing capital holders, and commercial production soon began to outstrip the previously dominant municipal fisheries. The government encouraged this increasing output, without regard to environmental sustainability.

Demersal fisheries peaked in the late 1960s in most areas. A number of provinces banned trawling at various points starting from 1954, until May 1983 when trawling was banned within 7 kilometres (4.3 mi) of the shore or in water shallower than 7 fathoms nationwide. Demersal catches did not increase after 1976. Deep-sea fishing began with Squalidae exploitation, primarily the Centrophorus genus, near San Joaquin, Iloilo, in 1967. Distribution technology, by roads and by sea, also improved during this time, providing larger markets for catches. Capture fisheries grew steadily until the mid-1970s, and starting growing again in the mid-1980s until the 1990s. While municipal catches decreased during parts of this period, increasing commercial catches compensated for this.

Presidential Decree 704 of 1975 was the most significant fishery law since 1932, becoming the new basis for Philippine fisheries law upon its issuance on May 16, 1975. This decree maintained the established definition of municipal waters as being 3 nautical miles (5.6 km; 3.5 mi) from the shore, although this did not at the time exclude commercial fishing from these waters. A later amendment allowed the President to ban commercial fishing in chosen municipal waters.

The tuna industry became large enough for a producers and exporters association to form in the 1970s. The mid-1970s saw the introduction of payao, which made tuna fisheries the most valuable in the country. Production increased until the Philippines was the largest producer in Southeast Asia in the 1980s, and as catches decreased at the end of that decade Philippine fishing fleets began to catch tuna in international waters. The decade also saw crab fisheries expand beyond artisanal tools, leading to a rapid reduction in crab populations due to trawling. In 1978, Presidential Decree 1599 established the country's exclusive economic zone, expanding the potential fisheries under Philippine jurisdiction. Executive Order 656 of 1981 created the National Committee on Illegal Entrants, whose mandate included tackling foreign fishing in Philippine waters.

During the 1970s commercial operations outcompeted small-scale fisherfolk exploiting the same fisheries, further diminishing the already shrinking fish stocks available. While the number of ships in the commercial fleet was roughly stable, the average size of these ships increased. Municipal fishery production dropped to just 30% of the total. The capture of small pelagic fish plateaued after 1975, despite still-increasing fishing effort. Trawling decreased starting in the 1980s due to the overfishing of demersal fisheries combined with increasing cost, becoming replaced by the cheaper Danish seine. Artificial reefs, already used as fish aggregating devices since the 1950s, began to be officially encouraged as conservation and anti-trawling devices in the 1980s. When placed in municipal waters, they often attracted illegal commercial fishing. Their overall impact was mixed, sometimes damaging.

=== Devolution and the Fisheries Code of 1998 ===
The newly created 1987 constitution included a specific reference to the "preferential use" of fishing resources by "subsistence fishermen". A presidential committee on illegal fishing and marine conservation was established in 1989. In 1991, local governments became empowered in areas including fishing through Republic Act 7160 (the Local Government Code of 1991), now explicitly able to regulate without national government approval. This enabled more specific management of these coastal areas, and coastal resource management with the aim of sustainability became more common. It also expanded municipal waters from 7 kilometres (4.3 mi) to 15 kilometres (9.3 mi), shifting commercial fishing further from the shore, although in a way that created legal uncertainty around commercial fishing licensing and activities. In 1992, the National Integrated Protected Areas System Act (RA 7586) created a common framework for protected areas, including marine ones. This came during a period of political conflict due to increasing disputes over fisheries resources and the spread of the understanding of sustainability.

Overall marine landings were relatively flat from 1991 to 1995. From 1985 to 1998, fisheries contributed an average of 3.5% of GDP (an increasing absolute value as overall GDP expanded). In 1998, it was 2.7% (17.6% of agricultural activities), while providing 3% of employment, of which 68% was from manpower-intensive municipal fisheries, 26% from aquaculture, and 6% from commercial fishing. During the 1997 Asian financial crisis, the fishery industry expanded despite most industries contracting.

In 1998, fisheries laws were entirely overhauled through Republic Act 8550 (the Fisheries Code of 1998), which replaced all former laws and became the basis of further legislation going forward. The legal debate around commercial fishing was clarified, assigning jurisdiction to local governments who could allow boats up to 50 GT to fish from 10.1 kilometres (6.3 mi) off their shores.

In August 1999, six tuna fishing associations formed the SOCCSKSARGEN Federation of Fishing Associations and Allied Industries (SFFAAI). Two tuna processing associations from General Santos joined in 2000. SFFAAI pushed the government to more actively participate in the establishment of the Western and Central Pacific Fisheries Commission, which led to the commission exempting traditional fishing boats from regional stringent monitoring requirements. It also encouraged the signing of bilateral deals for fishing access with neighboring countries. The Philippine Confederation of Tuna Industries was formed in 2000 to include tuna industry participants from the rest of the country. The National Tuna Industry Council was established by the government in 2000 to coordinate with the industry body.

In 2012, 49% of capture fisheries were commercial, and 16,500 people were employed in commercial fisheries. A closure of part of international waters in the Pacific Ocean between Indonesia, Palau, the Federated States of Micronesia, and Papua New Guinea, known as high seas pocket 1 caused some damage to the Philippine tuna industry. The Philippines lobbied for its reopening, which occurred in 2012 when 36 vessels were granted access.

The Bureau of Fisheries and Aquatic Resources issued Fisheries Administrative Order 263 (FAO 263) in 2019, dividing Philippine waters into 12 Fisheries Management Areas taking into account geography and fish stock distribution. Following the annexation of Benham Rise, it was announced this territory would become a special fisheries management area. Implementation of the new FMAs lagged behind the laws. By mid-2021, 11 FMAs had been established, although only 6 of the originally 12 FMAs had established scientific advisory groups, and funding and reporting structures were still undefined. Some of these delays were caused by the COVID-19 pandemic in the Philippines. By 2022, all 12 management boards had been organized, and 11 scientific advisory groups had been set up.

In 2020, fisheries made up 1.52% of GDP Growth in the commercial sector in 2020 increased overall fisheries production, despite decreases in municipal capture and aquaculture output. In 2021, fisheries produced 4.25 million metric tons (PhP 302.44 billion), of which 0.87 million metric tons (20.48%) was from commercial fisheries. There were 923 licensed commercial vessel operators. In 2022, commercial fisheries produced 862,686.35 metric tons (19.89% of total fisheries production). More than half of commercial fisheries products were landed in Region XII (Soccsksargen) and Region IX (Zamboanga Peninsula) combined. There were 5,090 registered commercial fishing vessels under 1,004 registered operators. Of these vessels, 45.66% were small-scale, 48.39% medium-scale, and 5.97% large-scale. Over half of the operators were registered in Metro Manila.
