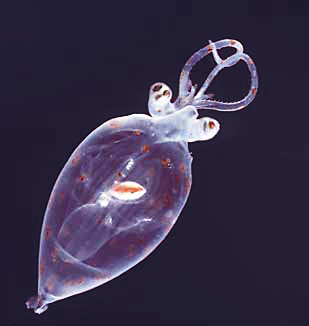
- Planktonic cranch squid paralarva; Antarctica

Scientific classification
- Kingdom: Animalia
- Phylum: Mollusca
- Class: Cephalopoda
- Division: Neocoleoidea
- Superorder: Decapodiformes; Leach, 1817

Synonyms
- Decembrachiata Winckworth, 1932

= Decapodiformes =

Decapodiformes Temporal range: Early Devonian – Recent

Superorder of Cephalopoda

Decapodiformes is a superorder of Cephalopoda comprising all cephalopod species with ten limbs, specifically eight short arms and two long tentacles. It is hypothesized that the ancestral coleoid had five identical pairs of limbs, and that one branch of descendants evolved a modified arm pair IV to become the Decapodiformes, while another branch of descendants evolved and then eventually lost its arm pair II, becoming the Octopodiformes.

== Taxonomy ==
The following orders are recognised in the superorder Decapodiformes:

- Bathyteuthida
- †Belemnitida
- †Diplobelida
- Idiosepida – pygmy squid
- Myopsida – neritic squid
- Oegopsida – pelagic squid
- Sepiida – cuttlefish
- Sepiolida – bobtail and bottletail squid
- Spirulida – ram's horn squid

=== Phylogeny ===
Molecular analyses consistently showed that the order Teuthida is invalid as its two constituent subgroups do not form a clade that did not exclude other decapodiform orders. Thus, Teuthida is presently considered an invalid order due to lack of monophyly.

Maximum Likelihood (ML) cladogram from Uribe & Zardoya 2017, based on complete mt genomes (protein-coding genes analysed at nucleotide level plus rRNA genes):

- Sepiida (outgroup)
  - Sepia apama
  - Sepia latimanus
- - Idiosepiida Idiosepiidae
    Idiosepius sp.
  - - Sepiolida Sepiolidae
      Semirossia patagonica
    - - Myopsida
        ⊞Loliginidae
        ⊟
        - Sepioteuthis lessoniana
        - - - Doryteuthis opalescens
            - Heterololigo bleekeri
          - - Uroteuthis duvaucelii
            - - - Loliolus beka
                - Loliolus uyii
              - - Uroteuthis edulis
                - Uroteuthis chinensis
      - - Bathyteuthoidea Bathyteuthidae
          Bathyteuthis abyssicola
        - - Spirulida
            Spirula spirula
          - Oegopsida
            ⊞3 families analyzed
            ⊟
            - Architeuthidae
              Architeuthis dux
            - - Enoploteuthidae
                Watasenia scintillans
              - Ommastrephidae
                - - Illex argentinus
                  - Todarodes pacificus
                - - Ommastrephes bartramii
                  - - Sthenoteuthis oualaniensis
                    - Dosidicus gigas

The following cladogram is based on a RAxML maximum likelihood phylogram from Anderson & Lindgren 2021:

- Octopodiformes
  ⊞
  ⊟
  - Vampyroteuthis infernalis
  - - Cirroctopus glacialis
    - - Octopus bimaculoides
      - Pareledone albimaculata
- Decapodiformes
  - Idiosepiida
    Idiosepius notoides
  - - Sepiolida
      ⊞
      ⊟
      - - Euprymna scolopes
        - Euprymna tasmanica
      - - Sepioloidea lineolata
        - Sepiadarium austrinum
    - - Oegopsida
        ⊞
        ⊟
        - - Galiteuthis armata
          - - Todarodes pacificus
            - - Dosidicus gigas
              - Sthenoteuthis oualaniensis
        - - - Onychoteuthis banksii
            - Architeuthis dux
          - - - Chiroteuthis calyx
              - Octopoteuthis deletron
            - - Pterygioteuthis hoylei
              - Watasenia scintillans
      - - Sepiida
          ⊞
          ⊟
          - - Sepia esculenta
            - Metasepia pfefferi
          - - Sepia pharaonis
            - - Sepia officinalis
              - - Sepiella japonica
                - Sepiella maindroni
        - Myopsida
          ⊞
          ⊟
          - Sepioteuthis lessoniana
          - - - Uroteuthis edulis
              - Loligo vulgaris
            - - Heterololigo bleekeri
              - - Doryteuthis pealei
                - Lolliguncula brevis
