= Afrololigo =

Conservation status
- Least Concern (IUCN 3.1)

Scientific classification
- Kingdom: Animalia
- Phylum: Mollusca
- Class: Cephalopoda
- Order: Myopsida
- Family: Loliginidae
- Genus: Afrololigo; Brakoniecki, 1986
- Species: A. mercatoris

Binomial name
- Afrololigo mercatoris (Adam, 1941)

Synonyms
- Lolliguncula mercatoris Adam, 1941

Genus of squids

Afrololigo mercatoris, commonly known as the Guinean thumbstall squid, is a small species of squid in the family Loliginidae from the eastern central Atlantic Ocean. It is the only species in the monotypic genus Afrololigo.

== Description ==
Afrololigo mercatoris is a relatively small species of squid where the females reach a mantle length of 50mm and the males attain 35mm. Its mantle is wide, the width being equal to around 35% of the length of the mantle, and blunt at the posterior end. It has short, round fins, equalling 40-45% of the length of the mantle and between 55% and 65% of mantle length in width, with a convex margin at the rear. The head is short and there are no buccal suckers on the buccal lappets. The tentacular club is small and narrow with suckers which are set out in 4 longitudinal series, 4 or 5 pairs of medial suckers on the central part of the club, the manus which are enlarged when compared to the lateral suckers. The club suckers have rings of 15 to 25 sharp teeth which become more pointed and increase in size towards the tip. Its dorsal arms are very short in comparison with its other arms and in males the left ventral arm is hectocotylized. The arm has 6 to 12 pairs of normal suckers at its base with the suckers replaced towards the tip by elongate papillae, these are more strongly developed in the dorsal row.

== Distribution and ecology ==
Afrololigo mercatoris occurs only off the west coast of Africa from Rio de Oro in Mauritania) to Lüderitz Bay in Namibia. This species is collected from depths of less than 50 m where there are mud and sandy-mud substrates. There is very little data available on its life cycle and biology. The eggs are small and the spermatophores have long bodies made of cement. This species is not a species of interest to fisheries.

== Taxonomy ==
Afrololigo mercatoris shows some morphological similarity with the squids of the genus Lolliguncula, which is where William Adam originbally placed it when he described this species. However, based on morphology, genetic data and distribution Afrololigowas recognised as a distinct monotypic genus. The Red Sea species Uroteuthis abulati was also thought to be close to A. mercatoris.
