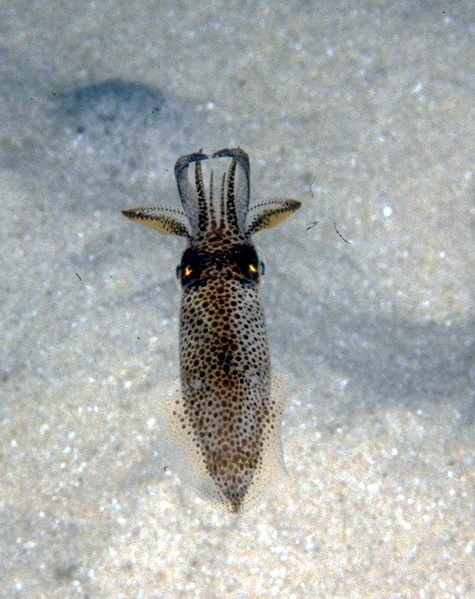

Scientific classification
- Domain: Eukaryota
- Kingdom: Animalia
- Phylum: Mollusca
- Class: Cephalopoda
- Order: Myopsida
- Family: Loliginidae
- Genus: Uroteuthis
- Species: U. noctiluca

Binomial name
- Uroteuthis noctiluca (Lu, Roper & Tait, 1985)

Synonyms
- Aestuariolus noctiluca (Lu, Roper & Tait, 1985); Loliolus noctiluca Lu, Roper & Tait, 1985

= Uroteuthis noctiluca =

Luminous bay squid

Species of cephalopods known as the luminous bay squid

Uroteuthis noctiluca, commonly known as the luminous bay squid, is a species of squid native to shallow water on the eastern coast of Australia. It uses a pair of luminous organs to camouflage itself from predators at night.

== Description ==
In this species, females grow larger than males. The maximum mantle length is about 90 mm (3.5 in), the width of the mantle being about 30% of the length. The fins are rounded and the posterior of the mantle is heart-shaped. The eight arms are short and there are rings of suckers on each arm, each sucker having four to seven teeth. The male has the fourth left arm hectocotylised over its entire length. The two tentacles are short and robust, with broad paddle-shaped clubs. There are two photophores on the underside of the ink sac. Populations in the north of the range differ from those in the south in the arrangement of the suckers on the male's right ventral arms. This squid has a colourless cuticle with a pattern of orange, black and brown dots.

== Distribution and habitat ==
Uroteuthis noctiluca is found in shallow waters on the eastern coast of Australia, its range extending from southern Queensland to Tasmania. It is often in seagrass meadows at a maximum depth of about 50 m (160 ft).

== Biology ==
This small squid is short-lived, surviving for about seventy days in tropical waters but rather longer than this in the temperate south of its range. It is tolerant of low salinity and is often found in brackish water, bays and estuaries. It is active at night, foraging for crustaceans and small fish. The photophores on its underside can be partially revealed to provide camouflage at night by concealing the squid's silhouette from below, the light output being varied to match the moonlight or starlight. The light organs of squid contain luminescent bacteria in the family Vibrionaceae; a number of different species of bacteria are involved, and some squid species host multiple strains.

Little is known of the reproductive behaviour of this squid. The male's specially adapted hectocotylis arm is likely to be used to deposit a spermatophore in the female's mantle, or to clear out sperm from a previous mating.
