= Uroteuthis arabica =

Conservation status
- Data Deficient (IUCN 3.1)

Scientific classification
- Kingdom: Animalia
- Phylum: Mollusca
- Class: Cephalopoda
- Order: Myopsida
- Family: Loliginidae
- Genus: Uroteuthis
- Species: U. arabica

Binomial name
- Uroteuthis arabica (Ehrenberg, 1831)

Species of cephalopod

Uroteuthis arabica is a species of squid from the genus Uroteuthis. The species is distributed across the Indian Ocean, and members are gonochoric.
