= Frederick Aldrich =

American marine biologist (1927–1991)

Frederick Aldrich in his laboratory at Memorial University with one of the 15 giant squid specimens he examined.

Frederick Allen Aldrich AB, M.Sc., Ph.D. (May 1, 1927 – July 12, 1991) was an American marine biologist and educator. He is best remembered for his research on giant squid.

== Biography ==
Aldrich was born in Butler, New Jersey, and attended Rutgers University, where he earned his doctorate. He began working at Memorial University of Newfoundland in 1961 as an associate professor of biology. He became head of the department two years later. He became the first director of the Marine Sciences Research Laboratory at Logy Bay in 1967.

In 1990, Aldrich became the Moses Harvey Professor of Marine Biology, a named chair that he would hold until his death.

== Recognition ==
The squid species Australiteuthis aldrichi is named after him.
