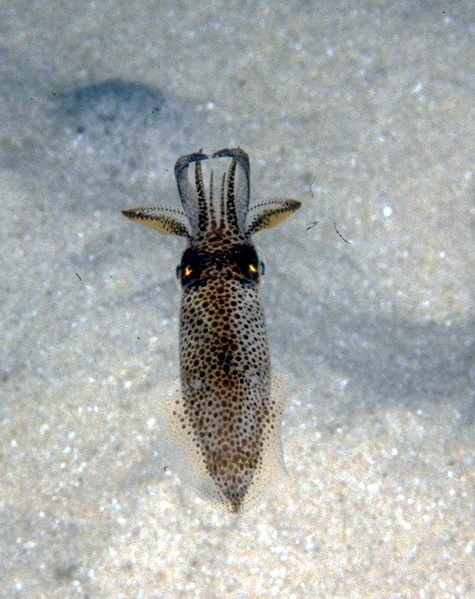
- Uroteuthis noctiluca

Scientific classification
- Kingdom: Animalia
- Phylum: Mollusca
- Class: Cephalopoda
- Order: Myopsida
- Family: Loliginidae
- Genus: Uroteuthis; Rehder, 1945

Type species
- Uroteuthis bartschi Rehder, 1945

Species
- See text

= Uroteuthis =

Genus of squids

Uroteuthis is a genus of 14 species of common inshore squids of the Indo-West Pacific and is further subdivided into 3 subgenera. The members of the genus Uroteuthis are the only squids of the family Loliginidae that possess photophores (light-emitting organs) and all species in the genus have a pair of photophore organs on the ventral surface of their ink sac either side of their intestine.

Uroteuthis species range in size between 3 cm and 100 cm (mantle length). As with all other members of the family Loliginidae, they have a cornea that covers the lens of each eye, and have a gladius that extends the full length of the mantle and a gill that has a branchial canal.

The type species for the genus is Uroteuthis bartschi described by Rehder in 1945.

== Distribution and range ==
The members of the genus Uroteuthis are neritic squids (i.e., they occupy waters over the continental shelves) leading to the common name inshore squid being used for many Uroteuthis species. They are distributed widely throughout the Indian Ocean and the Western Pacific, as well as the Red Sea and the Persian Gulf. The species within the genus are commercially important targets for large scale and artisanal fisheries.

== Subdivisions ==
The genus Uroteuthis is subdivided into three subgenera, two of which are represented by a single species each. The designation of two species (U. pickfordae and U. reesi) to subgenera has yet to be accepted.
Following convention, where a species has been re-designated to the genus Uroteuthis from a different genus, the originating authority has been included in brackets. Common names have been included where they are known and are unique to a species.

- Subgenus Uroteuthis
  - Uroteuthis bartschi Rehder, 1945: Bartsch's squid
- Subgenus Aesturariolus
  - Uroteuthis (Aesturariolus) noctiluca (Lu, Roper and Tait, 1985): luminous bay squid
- Subgenus Photololigo Natsukari, 1984
  - Uroteuthis abulati (Adam, 1955)
  - Uroteuthis arabica (Ehrenberg, 1831)
  - Uroteuthis bengalensis (Jothinayagam, 1987)
  - Uroteuthis chinensis (Gray, 1849): mitre squid
  - Uroteuthis duvauceli (Orbigny, 1835): Indian Ocean squid
  - Uroteuthis edulis (Hoyle, 1885): swordtip squid
  - Uroteuthis robsoni (Alexeyyev, 1992)
  - Uroteuthis sibogae (Adam, 1954): Siboga squid
  - Uroteuthis singhalensis (Ortmann, 1891): long barrel squid
  - Uroteuthis vossi (Nesis, 1982)
- Subgenus incertae sedis (i.e. uncertain)
  - Uroteuthis pickfordae (Adam, 1954)
  - Uroteuthis reesi (Voss, 1962)
