= Uroteuthis reesi =

Conservation status
- Data Deficient (IUCN 3.1)

Scientific classification
- Kingdom: Animalia
- Phylum: Mollusca
- Class: Cephalopoda
- Order: Myopsida
- Family: Loliginidae
- Genus: Uroteuthis
- Species: U. reesi

Binomial name
- Uroteuthis reesi (G. L. Voss, 1962)

Species of squid

Uroteuthis reesi, commonly known as Rees' squid, is a species of squid in the family Loliginidae. The maximum reported mantle size was 72 mm for males, and 63 mm for females. U. reesi is usually found around the Indo-West Pacific.
