= Uroteuthis vossi =

Conservation status
- Data Deficient (IUCN 3.1)

Scientific classification
- Kingdom: Animalia
- Phylum: Mollusca
- Class: Cephalopoda
- Order: Myopsida
- Family: Loliginidae
- Genus: Uroteuthis
- Species: U. vossi

Binomial name
- Uroteuthis vossi (Nesis, 1982)

Species of cephalopod

Uroteuthis vossi is a species of squid from the genus Uroteuthis. The species can be found in the Pacific Ocean, and members are gonochoric.
