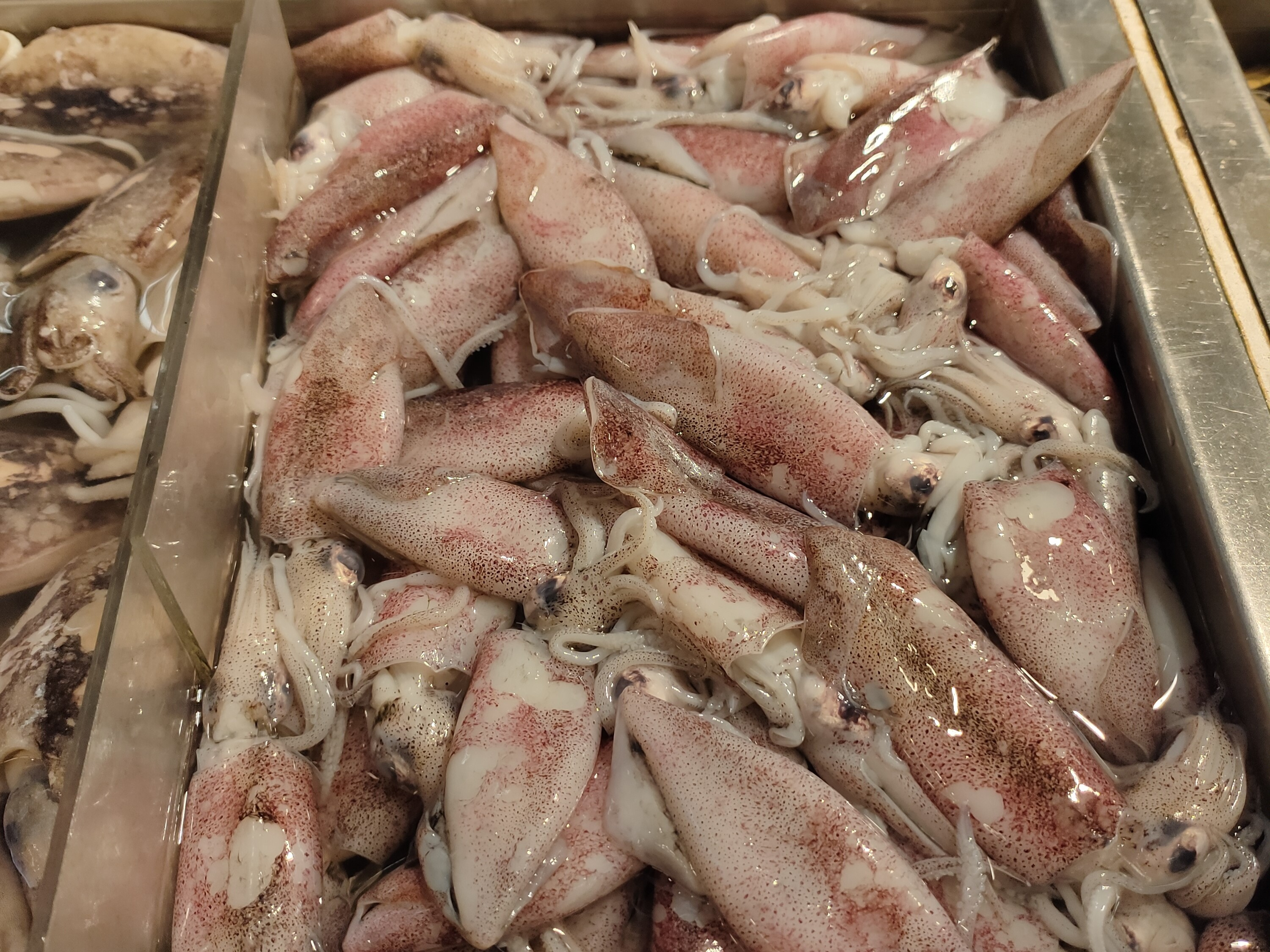

Conservation status
- Data Deficient (IUCN 3.1)

Scientific classification
- Kingdom: Animalia
- Phylum: Mollusca
- Class: Cephalopoda
- Order: Myopsida
- Family: Loliginidae
- Genus: Uroteuthis
- Species: U. sibogae

Binomial name
- Uroteuthis sibogae (Adam, 1954)

= Uroteuthis sibogae =

Species of cephalopod

Uroteuthis sibogae is a species of squid from the genus Uroteuthis. The species has been documented in the Pacific Ocean near India, and members of the species can grown to a length of ~16 centimeters.
