= Australiteuthis =

- Holotype of Australiteuthis aldrichi (21.3 mm ML)

Conservation status
- Least Concern (IUCN 3.1)

Scientific classification
- Kingdom: Animalia
- Phylum: Mollusca
- Class: Cephalopoda
- Order: Myopsida
- Family: Australiteuthidae; Lu, 2005
- Genus: Australiteuthis; Lu, 2005
- Species: A. aldrichi

Binomial name
- Australiteuthis aldrichi Lu, 2005

Genus of squids

Australiteuthis aldrichi is a small species of squid found in northern Australian waters. The species was described by Chung Cheng Lu in 2005 based on specimens collected in the inshore waters of Northern Australia. The largest known individual of this species is a mature female measuring 27.6 mm (1.09 in) in mantle length (ML). The holotype is a mature male of 21.3 mm (0.84 in) ML. A live specimen of A. aldrichi has yet to be recorded.

A. aldrichi is a member of the class Cephalopoda and part of the subclass Coleoidea. Within this class there are two orders, the Myopsida and the Oegopsida, which both fall under the superorder Decapodiformes. A. aldrichi falls under the order of Myopsida, and is the only member of its genus, Australiteuthis, and the family, Australiteuthidae.

== Order ==
The Myopsida order is made up of two families, the Australiteuthidae and Loliginidae. The squid which fall under the order of Myopsida are nertic squid that typically dwell in shallow waters and appear in large schools. Within the family of Loliginidae, species such as the Loligo forbesii, also known as the veined and long-finned squid, may reach sizes up to 90 cm (35 in) in mantle length. A. aldrichi, however, are much more similar in size to members of the genus Pickfordiateuthis, more commonly known as dwarf squid, as males of the A. aldrichi species have been observed to reach 17 mm (0.67 in) in mantle length at a fully mature state.

== Characteristics of Myopsida ==
Members of the Myopsida order exhibit the following characteristics:

1. Arms and tentacles that contain circular muscles.
2. Tentacles that are clubbed without a proximal locking-apparatus.
3. The head contains tentacle pockets.
4. The eyes contain a corneal membrane covering lens instead of a secondary eyelid.
5. A funnel that does not contain adductor muscles.
6. A mantle which contains a mantle locking apparatus.
7. A shell underneath the mantle.
8. Viscera and gills with a branchial canal.
9. Eggs that contain a large external yolk sac.

== Habitat ==
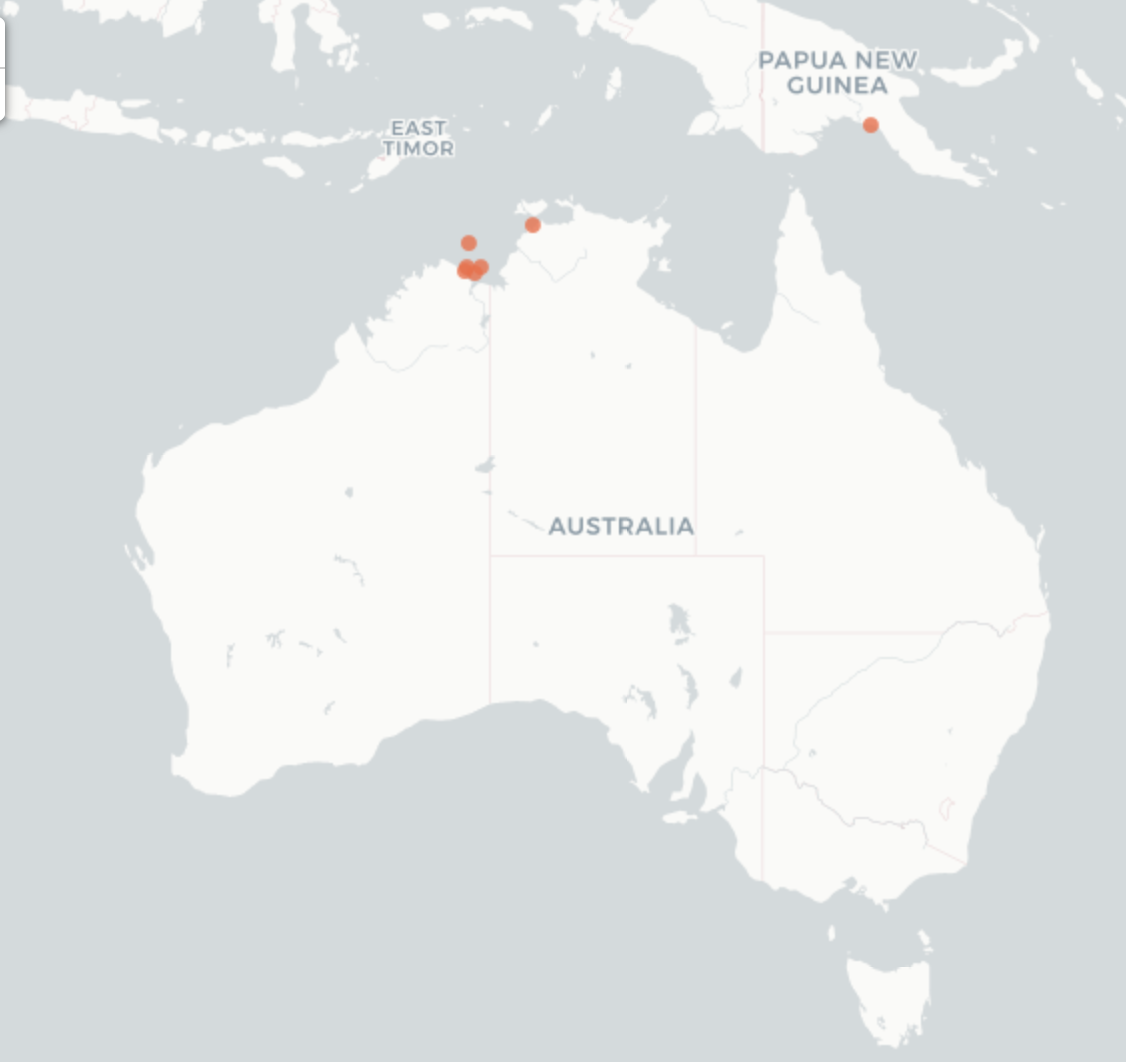
Documented locations of Australiteuthis in Australia

Specimens of A. aldrich have been found in the Joseph Bonaparte Gulf of Western Australia, the inshore waters of the Northern Territory of Australia as well as the Gulf of Papua in New Guinea. (PNG). It has been theorized that the species may live along the coastal regions in Australia and Papua New Guinea. The species has never been found alive and is only known from a handful of specimens collected in these areas. These A. aldrichi specimens were collected at depths between 9 metres (30 ft) to 61 metres (200 ft) by fishermen using beam trawls. It has also been speculated that the species may be a benthic squid but it is not yet truly known.

== Biology ==
A. aldrichi have been found at depths ranging from 9 metres (30 ft) to 61 metres (200 ft) and are speculated to live within the benthic zone. From the specimens collected, mature males may have a mantle length of 17 millimetres (1.7 cm) and mature females may have a mantle length of over 22 millimetres (2.2 cm). The species has large, separate, round fins with free anterior and posterior lobes as well as a large dumbbell-shaped photophore. Other biological features of the species include a deep tentacular pocket, tricuspid rachidial teeth, a lack of aquiferous pores in the cornea, eyes covered with a transparent cornea, and a photophore on the ink sac. The species is classified in the order Myopsida because of its shared characteristic of a corneal membrane.
