= Uroteuthis pickfordae =

Conservation status
- Data Deficient (IUCN 3.1)

Scientific classification
- Kingdom: Animalia
- Phylum: Mollusca
- Class: Cephalopoda
- Order: Myopsida
- Family: Loliginidae
- Genus: Uroteuthis
- Species: U. pickfordae

Binomial name
- Uroteuthis pickfordae (Adam, 1954)

Synonyms
- Doryteuthis pickfordae Adam, 1954; Doryteuthis pickfordi Adam, 1954; Loligo pickfordi (Adam, 1954); Uroteuthis pickfordi (Adam, 1954)

Species of squid

Uroteuthis pickfordae, commonly known as the siboga squid, is a species of squid in the family Loliginidae. It was described as Doryteuthis pickfordae. It is a small squid, with an average mantle length between 110 mm and 140 mm. It is mostly found around the Flores Island, Indonesia.
