= Swordtip squid =

Conservation status
- Data Deficient (IUCN 3.1)

Scientific classification
- Kingdom: Animalia
- Phylum: Mollusca
- Class: Cephalopoda
- Order: Myopsida
- Family: Loliginidae
- Genus: Uroteuthis
- Species: U. edulis

Binomial name
- Uroteuthis edulis (Hoyle, 1885)

Species of cephalopod

The swordtip squid (Uroteuthis edulis) is a species of loliginid squid from the genus Uroteuthis. It was first described by William Evans Hoyle in 1885. In the past, it resided among the genus Loligo until it was reclassified under the genus Uroteuthis. They have previously been under the subgenus Photololigo, but this is no longer taxonomically accepted. This is because they possess photophores under their ink sacs, which divided them from other genus of squid.

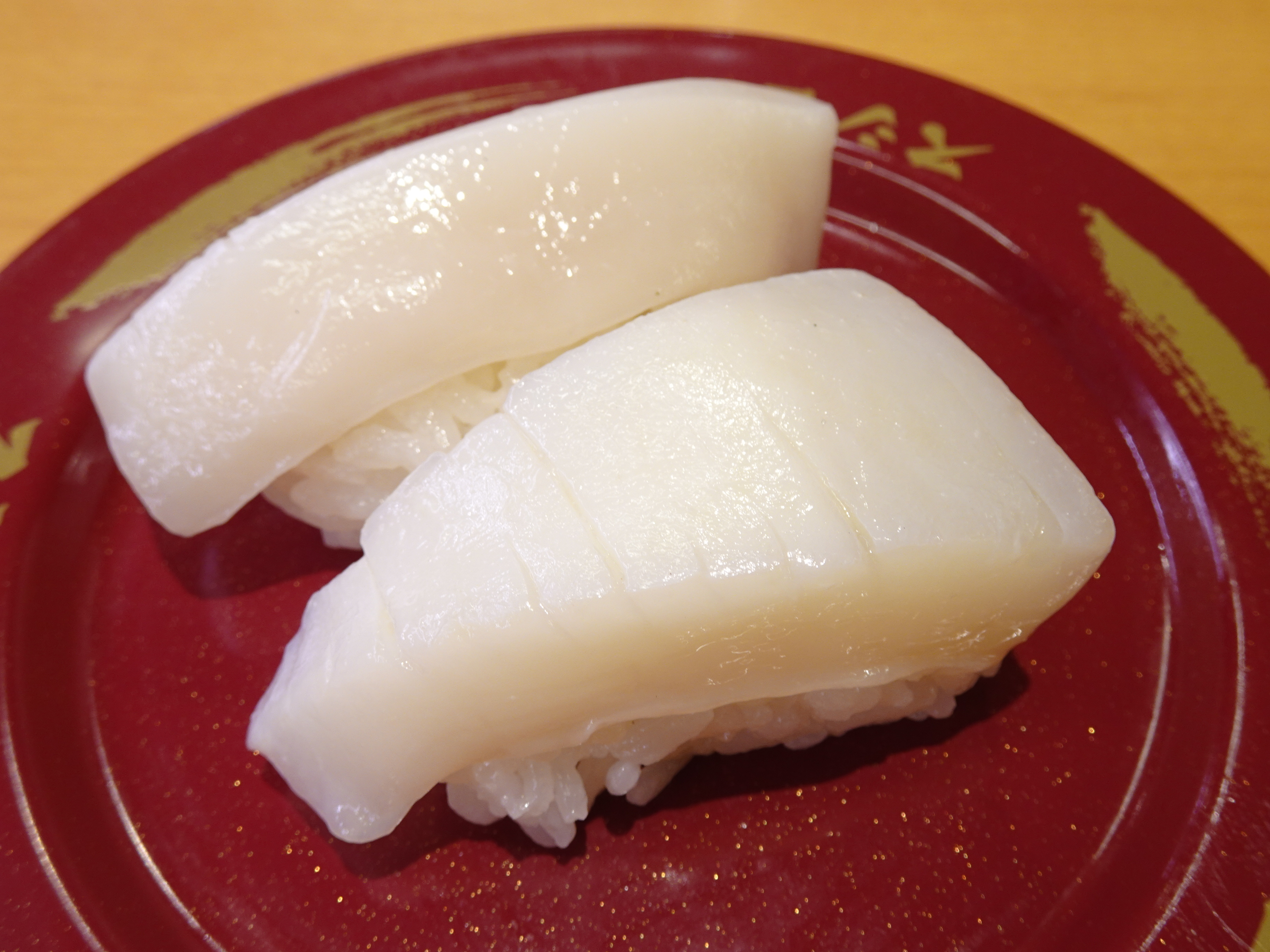
As sushi

This species is a very important source of revenue for many fishermen, especially those in southern Japan and the eastern Tsushima Strait. Sometimes this squid is eaten alive (lively squid) in northwestern Kyushu, Japan. They are caught in purse seines, which capture the squids in large capacity. Other forms of capture include jigs, set nets, and bottom trawls. The current conservation status of the Swordtip Squid is listed as Data Deficient according to IUCN Red List. There is limited information about their total population number, so there are not many conservation efforts currently.

== Taxonomy ==
The Swordtip squid was first described by British zoologist William Evans Hoyle in 1885. It originally belonged to the genus Loligo under the name Loligo edulis before the move to the genus Uroteuthis, which currently has 14 species with a number of species also moved from Loligo. Uroteuthis edulis has previously reigned under the subgenus Photololigo, but that is now currently taxonomically unacceptable. They were given this name because they possess photophores on the lower side of their ink sacs.

The specific name is derived from the Latin word edulis, which means edible.

== Anatomy and morphology ==
The Swordtip Squid possesses bilateral symmetry along with large lens eyes on each side of their head, along with 8 arms and 2 tentacles. They are one of few species that possess photophores under their inks sacks, which led to their earlier taxonomic classification in the subgenus Photololigo. The male Swordtip squid tends can grow up to 65 cm, while the females can grow up to 40 cm. This can vary based upon changes to their environment. The mantle length of adult females tends to be in the 20-30 cm range, while the male's mantle length is between 30-40 cm. Most of the squids that are caught commercially have mantle lengths that are 15-25 cm long. Depending on environmental factors such as temperature change, the growth for these squids can change. Growth can be tracked from the growth rings on their statoliths. The squids possess fins on the mantle around 70% of their length. These larger fins are used for steering and stability, along with propulsion at slower speeds in more contained areas such as rocks and reefs.

These squids possess sexual dimorphism in regards to their beak size and shape. It has been found that the upper beak is slightly larger than the lower beak, as they are split into two. The females have a larger upper beak in the mature stages of their growth because they develop faster than the males. The shape of the beak is inferred to have morphed in certain squid species depending on their biological needs and preferences. The lifespan of the species is around one year, with those in temperate waters being closer to nine months. The length of the species differs upon sex.

Uroteuthis edulis and Uroteuthis chinensis are very similar morphologically. They have remained closely taxonomically linked because of their similarities. The differences in their arms have been a good way to distinguish between the two species. U. chinensis has 10-18 sharp teeth in each of their arm suckers, while U. edulis tends to have 6-12. Males of both species possess a hectocotylus, a special arm specialized to transfer sperm sacks to the females. The male species can be distinguished by the portion of the arm that is specialized. The hectocotylus of U. edulis covers half to two-thirds of the arm, while it is closer to one-third in U. chinensis.

== Distribution and habitat ==
The Swordtip squid is distributed throughout the Western Pacific Ocean, mostly near Eastern Asia. It can be found in northern regions such as the southern part of the Sea of Japan and the East China Sea, along with more tropical regions like the coasts of Thailand, Indonesia, and Malaysia. They have been documented in Northern Australian waters, but has been disproved by recent studies looking at the distribution of squid species around Australia. They are typically found within the eastern Tsushima Strait in regards to commercial fishing. Their migration patterns can be assessed by the small growths of the statolith, which can differ depending on the season they decide to migrate. Recent studies have showed that the squids found off of the coast of Australia are not actually the Swordtip squid, even though they had been previously documented.

They are found in shallow waters because that is where they tend to spawn. This can be anywhere from 30 m to 100 m below surface level. With most of their prey being within these depths, they tend to stay between those depths because they have access to their biological needs like feeding and reproducing.

== Behavior and ecology ==
The Swordtip squid is a migratory species, as they travel to certain areas to reproduce. The main seasons that they spawn are in spring and autumn, but the species will spawn in each season. According to statolith measurements, scientists are able to infer the migratory routes of the Swordtip squid. The eggs will hatch all year long, but the mature squids will die after spawning. Before the point of reproduction, this squid is quite solitary. When the time comes to reproduce, the males will perform mating rituals to attract the females for spawning. As for feeding, juveniles tend to eat crustaceans such as crabs and shrimp. The adult squids feed on crustaceans, but also fish and other squids.

It has been found that Swordtip squid near Japan possess a larger growth rate when they hatch in a warmer season such as summer or winter. Water temperature is a large factor that contributes to the growth of this squid, but it also shortens the life expectancy of the squid. This is because of the amount of energy that is needed to grow faster. Since they reach sexual maturity more quickly, they will die quicker as they are reproducing earlier than usual.

The larger the female squids become, the greater fecundity they possess. This is because there is a correlation between mantle size and the amount of eggs that are able to be carried in the ovaries. The eggs that they carry are laid in batches. Researchers are still working to figure out more about how the Swordtip squid's growth and reproductive behavior are affected by environmental factors.

== Conservation status ==
According to the IUCN Red List, the Swordtip squid is listed as Data Deficient in terms of their conservation status. There is currently not enough data on their population numbers to dictate them to a certain status level. They have a very large distribution, which potentially makes it difficult to assess the population as a whole. There have been few conservation efforts because of the unknowns regarding their status. One of the known conservation efforts has been from Chinese squid fisheries, as they have banned the collection of squid in their spawning habitats.
