= Uroteuthis robsoni =

Conservation status
- Data Deficient (IUCN 3.1)

Scientific classification
- Kingdom: Animalia
- Phylum: Mollusca
- Class: Cephalopoda
- Order: Myopsida
- Family: Loliginidae
- Genus: Uroteuthis
- Species: U. robsoni

Binomial name
- Uroteuthis robsoni (Alexeyyev, 1992)

Species of cephalopod

Uroteuthis robsoni is a species of squid from the genus Uroteuthis. The species has been documented off the coast of India and Australia.
