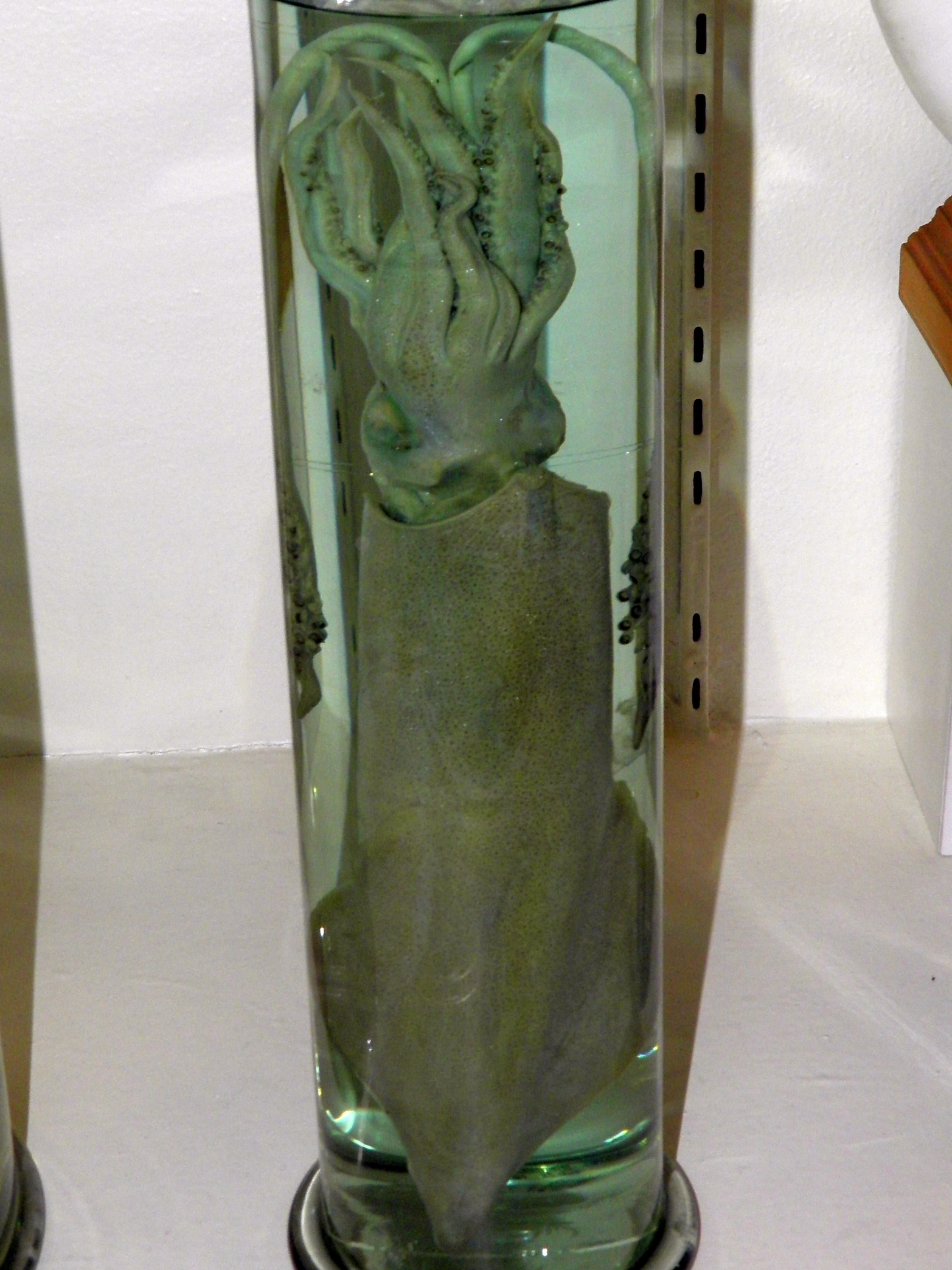
- Preserved specimen of U. singhalensis

Conservation status
- Data Deficient (IUCN 3.1)

Scientific classification
- Kingdom: Animalia
- Phylum: Mollusca
- Class: Cephalopoda
- Order: Myopsida
- Family: Loliginidae
- Genus: Uroteuthis
- Species: U. singhalensis

Binomial name
- Uroteuthis singhalensis (Ortmann, 1891)

Synonyms
- Loligo singhalensis Ortmann, 1891; Doryteuthis singhalensis (Ortmann, 1891); Loligo singhalensis var. beryllae G. C. Robson, 1928; Uroteuthis (Photololigo) singhalensis (Ortmann, 1891)

= Uroteuthis singhalensis =

Species of cephalopod

Uroteuthis singhalensis, commonly known as the long barrel squid, is a species of squid from the genus Uroteuthis. The species can be found in the Indo-West Pacific Ocean.

== Taxonomy and history ==
This species was first described as Loligo singhalensis by Arnold Edward Ortmann in 1891, with the description published in volume five of Zoologische Jahrbücher.

The World Register of Marine Species regards Uroteuthis singhalensis as a member of the Uroteuthis subgenus Photololigo.

== Description ==
Uroteuthis singhalensis is a species of squid characterized by its long, slender body shape. The mantle (main body) is cylindrical, tapering to a sharp point at the rear, and is about 4–7 times as long as it is wide in mature individuals. The fins are relatively narrow and rhombic (diamond-shaped) in outline, extending for about half the length of the mantle in adults, though shorter in young specimens. The front edge of the fins curves slightly outward, while the rear edge curves slightly inward. The head is comparatively small and short, with medium-sized eyes.

The arms are slender and fairly short compared to the body. The suckers on the arms have 6–11 (most commonly 9) flat, squared-off teeth along their outer edges. In male squids, the left ventral arm is modified into a reproductive organ called a hectocotylus, affecting 40–45% of the arm's length in mature males. The modified portion has fleshy, cone-shaped papillae instead of normal suckers. The tentacles are short and slender, with relatively short clubs (the expanded end sections used for catching prey). The suckers on the clubs have 15–20 sharp, conical teeth around their edges.

Two small light-producing organs called photophores are present on the ink sac. The gladius, an internal shell-like structure that provides support, is very narrow with almost straight sides and is widest at its front third. This species can be distinguished from similar squids by its narrow body shape, fin proportions, arm sucker dentition, and details of the hectocotylus in males. However, proper identification often requires examination by squid experts due to the subtle differences between some closely related species.

== Habitat and distribution ==
Uroteuthis singhalensis is an Indo-Pacific species with a wide distribution across tropical and subtropical waters. In the western Pacific, it can be found from the South China Sea, including waters around Singapore and Indonesia, northward to Taiwan. Its range extends westward into the Indian Ocean, where it has been recorded in the Andaman Sea off Thailand, throughout the Bay of Bengal, and along the coasts of India and Sri Lanka.

The species' distribution continues further west into the Arabian Sea and along the eastern African coast. It has been reported from Somalia southward to Mozambique, including the waters around the Seychelles and the Mascarene underwater ridge.

Uroteuthis singhalensis is primarily a neritic species, meaning it inhabits coastal waters over the continental shelf. While it is most commonly found in inshore areas, it has been reported at depths of up to 220 meters.

== Fisheries ==
This species is used for commercial fisheries, including in the Philippines and Sri Lanka. The species has a number of commercial names.
