= Uroteuthis bengalensis =

Conservation status
- Data Deficient (IUCN 3.1)

Scientific classification
- Kingdom: Animalia
- Phylum: Mollusca
- Class: Cephalopoda
- Order: Myopsida
- Family: Loliginidae
- Genus: Uroteuthis
- Species: U. bengalensis

Binomial name
- Uroteuthis bengalensis (Jothinayagam, 1987)

Species of cephalopod

Uroteuthis bengalensis is a species of squid from the genus Uroteuthis. The species can be found in the Pacific Ocean, and members of the species are gonochoric.
