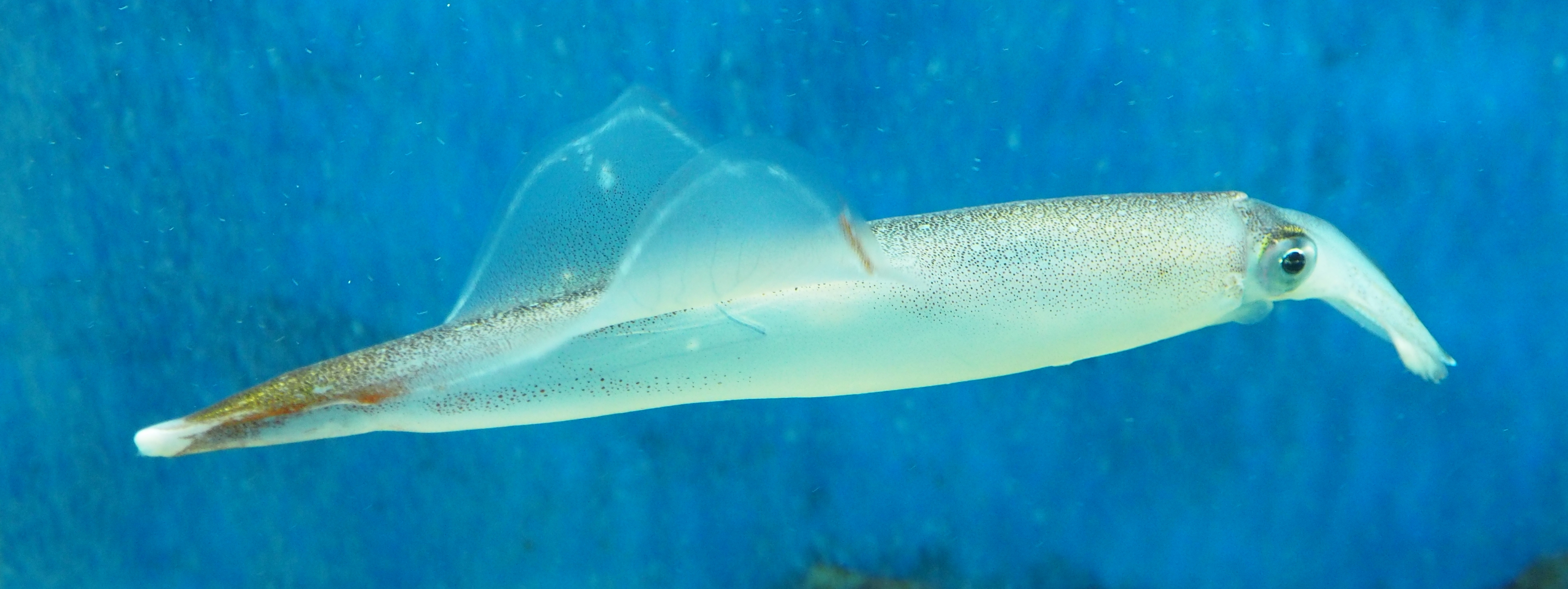
- At Sendai Umino-Mori Aquarium

Conservation status
- Least Concern (IUCN 3.1)

Scientific classification
- Kingdom: Animalia
- Phylum: Mollusca
- Class: Cephalopoda
- Order: Myopsida
- Family: Loliginidae
- Genus: Heterololigo; Natsukari, 1984
- Species: H. bleekeri

Binomial name
- Heterololigo bleekeri (Keferstein, 1866)

Synonyms
- Loligo bleekeri Keferstein, 1866

= Heterololigo =

Genus of squids

Heterololigo is a monotypic genus of squids containing the single species Heterololigo bleekeri. It was formerly classified in the genus Loligo; some authors still include it there, but DNA evidence supports its separation into a genus of its own. This species is known by the common name spear squid, or yari-ika in Japanese.

== Lifespan ==
It has a life span of about one year.

== Description ==
It can be distinguished from other species in its family by its shorter tentacles.

== Habitat and distribution ==
This squid is native to the western Pacific Ocean along the coast of Asia. It spawns in spring and summer in the northern part of its range, and in winter farther south. They are pelagic, found from around 0–100 m (0–328 ft).

== Reproduction ==
Like most Cephalopods, they are gonochoric. Male adults will usually die after spawning, and female adults after brooding. A unique aspect of the reproduction of this species has been well studied. The female has two sperm-storage sites in its body. There are two types of males, the larger "consort" males and the smaller "sneaker" males. Consorts insert sperm into the oviduct of the female, and sneakers place sperm into specialized tissue near the female's mouth. The two male types produce different types of sperm, as well: the large consorts produce sperm with short flagella, while the sneaker males have sperm with longer flagella. The consort sperm fertilize eggs internally, while sneaker sperm fertilize the eggs as they emerge from the female's body and brush past the external sperm-deposition site near the mouth. These alternative reproductive tactics appear to be determined by birth date.

== Relationships with humans ==
This squid is caught for food off the coast of Japan. It lays its eggs on the underside of submerged objects. In order to increase catches, artificial substrates have been installed along the coast of Japan to provide more egg-laying sites.

This species is important in biological research. Its mitochondrial genome has been sequenced. Its neurons are used in neurobiology research.

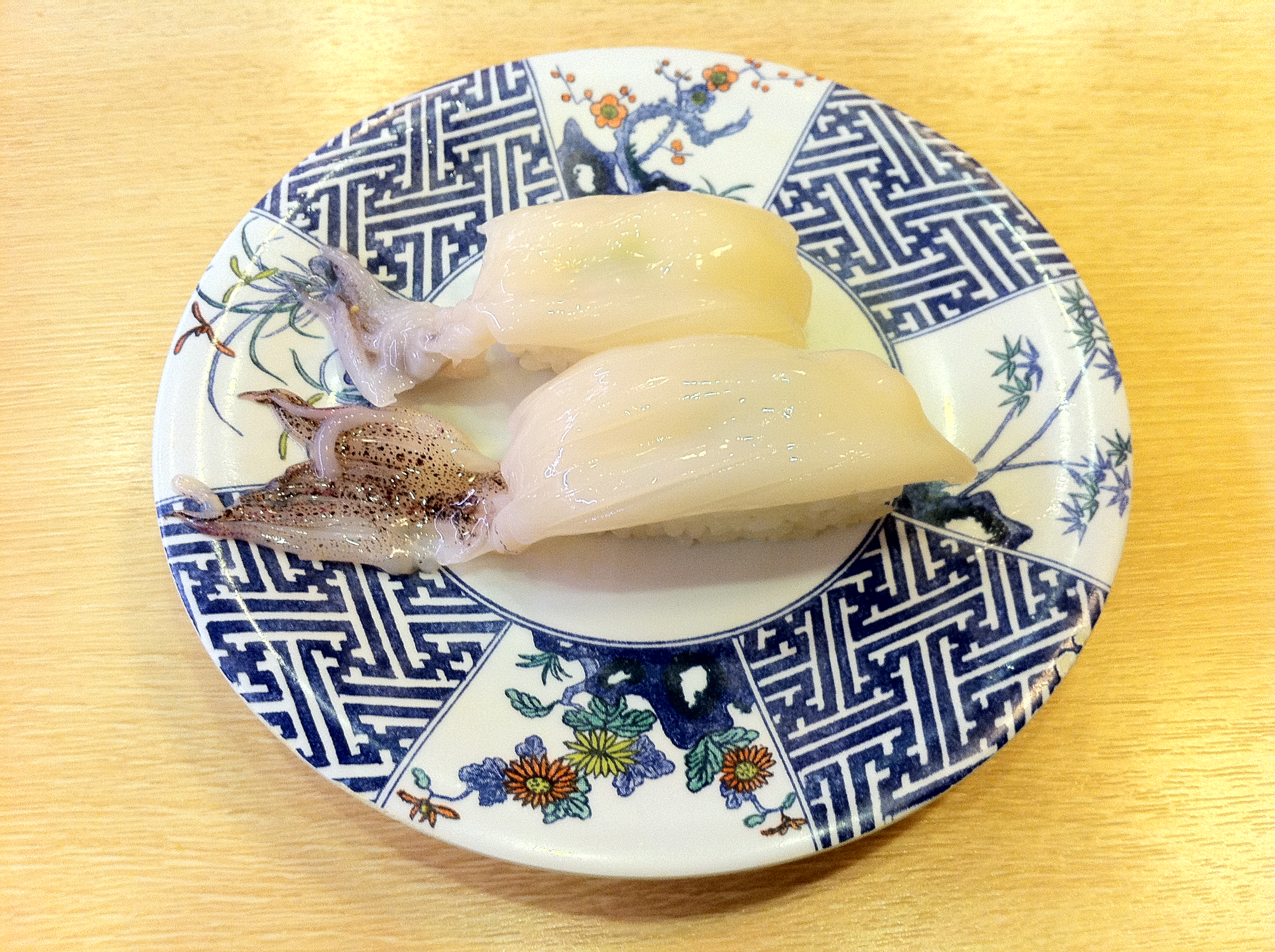
As sushi

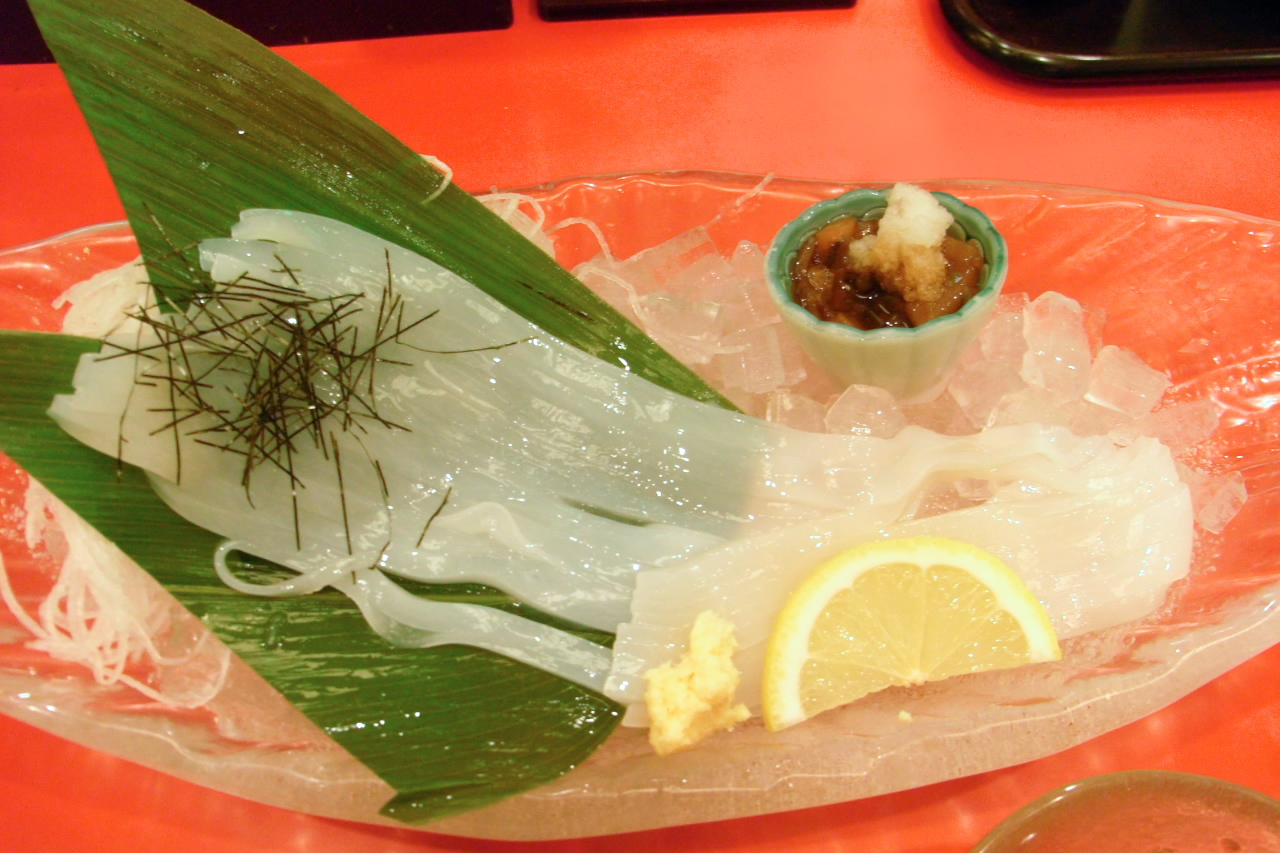
As ika sōmen
