= Uroteuthis abulati =

Conservation status
- Data Deficient (IUCN 3.1)

Scientific classification
- Kingdom: Animalia
- Phylum: Mollusca
- Class: Cephalopoda
- Order: Myopsida
- Family: Loliginidae
- Genus: Uroteuthis
- Species: U. abulati

Binomial name
- Uroteuthis abulati (Adam, 1955)

Species of cephalopod

Uroteuthis abulati is a species of squid from the genus Uroteuthis. The species can be found in the Indian Ocean, and members are gonochoric. It has a slender mantle, but the exact length is unknown. It is known to the Food and Agriculture Organization as the Red Sea Squid.
