= Uroteuthis bartschi =

Bartch's squid

Conservation status
- Data Deficient (IUCN 3.1)

Scientific classification
- Kingdom: Animalia
- Phylum: Mollusca
- Class: Cephalopoda
- Order: Myopsida
- Family: Loliginidae
- Genus: Uroteuthis
- Species: U. bartschi

Binomial name
- Uroteuthis bartschi Rehder, 1945

Species of mollusc

Uroteuthis bartschi, also known as Bartsch's squid, is a species of squid growing to a known mantle length of 20 cm (7.9 in). It is a type species of the genus Uroteuthis.
