= Loliolus beka =

Conservation status
- Data Deficient (IUCN 3.1)

Scientific classification
- Kingdom: Animalia
- Phylum: Mollusca
- Class: Cephalopoda
- Order: Myopsida
- Family: Loliginidae
- Genus: Loliolus
- Species: L. beka

Binomial name
- Loliolus beka (Sasaki, 1929)

Species of mollusc

Loliolus beka, the beka squid, is a species of squid found in the family Loliginidae. Their distribution ranges from temperate to tropical waters, however they are commonly found across the East China Sea as a result of bycatch. They are a predominantly benthic species, preferring to live in shallow waters. Like many other cephalopods, L. beka are a relatively short-lived species. The squid are small in size, with an average mantle length between 30 and 40 mm. Their diet and behavioral characteristics are common with other members of Loliginidae. These squid are valuable to both commercial fishermen and scientific researchers.

== Identification ==
Identification of squid in the family Loliginidae can be difficult to ascertain using morphological traits. This is because many of the squid have similar physical characteristics and their flexible bodies are easily damaged during capture. Scientists have devised multiple ways to accurately determine squid species. DNA barcoding, analyzing statolith shape, and the geometric outline method (beaks and statoliths) have proven useful in successfully identifying L. beka. Through genome sequencing, L. beka's closest relative was found to be Loliolus uyii.

== Human use ==
Loliolus beka are an economically important staple seafood in countries that fall within their geographic range. Korea, China, Japan, and Europe all actively fish for L. beka due to their tender meat and high taurine content. In addition, studies have found that a hot water extract made from their meat can be beneficial against vascular disease and act as a therapeutic functional food for diabetes. Similarly, consumption of L. beka meat was found to have the potential to protect cells from gamma ray inflicted damage.
