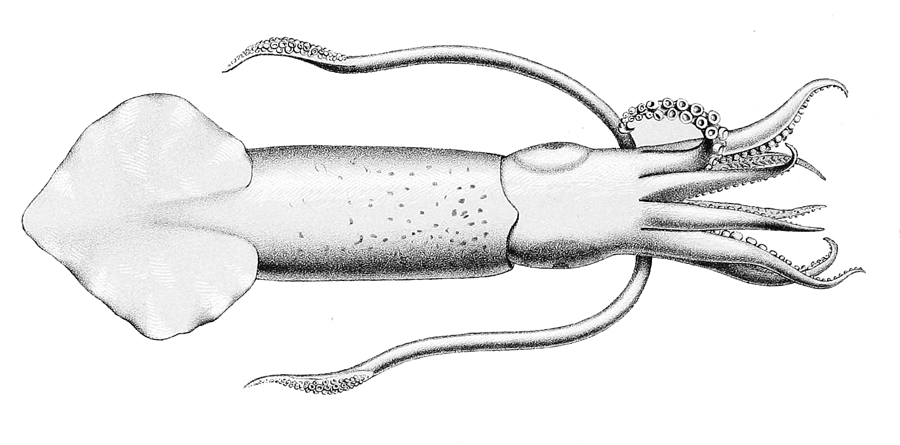

Conservation status
- Data Deficient (IUCN 3.1)

Scientific classification
- Kingdom: Animalia
- Phylum: Mollusca
- Class: Cephalopoda
- Order: Myopsida
- Family: Loliginidae
- Genus: Uroteuthis
- Species: U. duvaucelii

Binomial name
- Uroteuthis duvaucelii (d'Orbigny, 1835)

Synonyms
- Loligo duvaucelii d'Orbigny, 1835; Loligo indica Pfeffer, 1884; Loligo galatheae Hoyle, 1885; Loligo oshimai M. Sasaki, 1929; Uroteuthis (Photololigo) duvaucelii (d'Orbigny, 1835) (alternative representation)

= Uroteuthis duvaucelii =

Species of cephalopod

Uroteuthis duvaucelii, also known as the Indian squid, is an Indo-West Pacific species of squid. It has a wide range throughout the Indian Ocean from the east coast of Africa into the Red Sea and the Arabian Sea and to West Pacific off Taiwan and northern Australia. U. duvaucelii is found at depths between 3–170 m (10–560 ft) and feeds on fishes, crustaceans and other squids.

U. duvaucelii represents a significant species in commercial and artisanal fisheries throughout much of its range. E.g., catches of squid in the Philippines commercial fishery are 90% U. duvaucelii.

== Description ==
The mantle length reaches commonly about 15 cm (5.9 in) but can exceed 30 cm (12 in); the maximum length is 40 cm (16 in). The body is slender with broad fins, approximately 50% of the mantle length.

== Life cycle ==
During brooding fertilized embryos hatch into a planktonic stage migrating into the upper layers of the water column. As they grow larger they take up a benthic existence as adults, with males being slightly larger than females.

Spawning occurs throughout the year, with regionally varying peak season. It is initiated by males performing courtship displays to attract mates. During copulation, the male grasps the female and inserts his hectocotylus into her mantle cavity, where fertilization typically takes place. Adult males usually then die shortly after spawning, whilst females survive for a short while until after brooding.

The life cycle of U. duvaucelii lasts around 1 year, with different studies suggesting both shorter (even less than half a year) and slightly longer lifespans.
