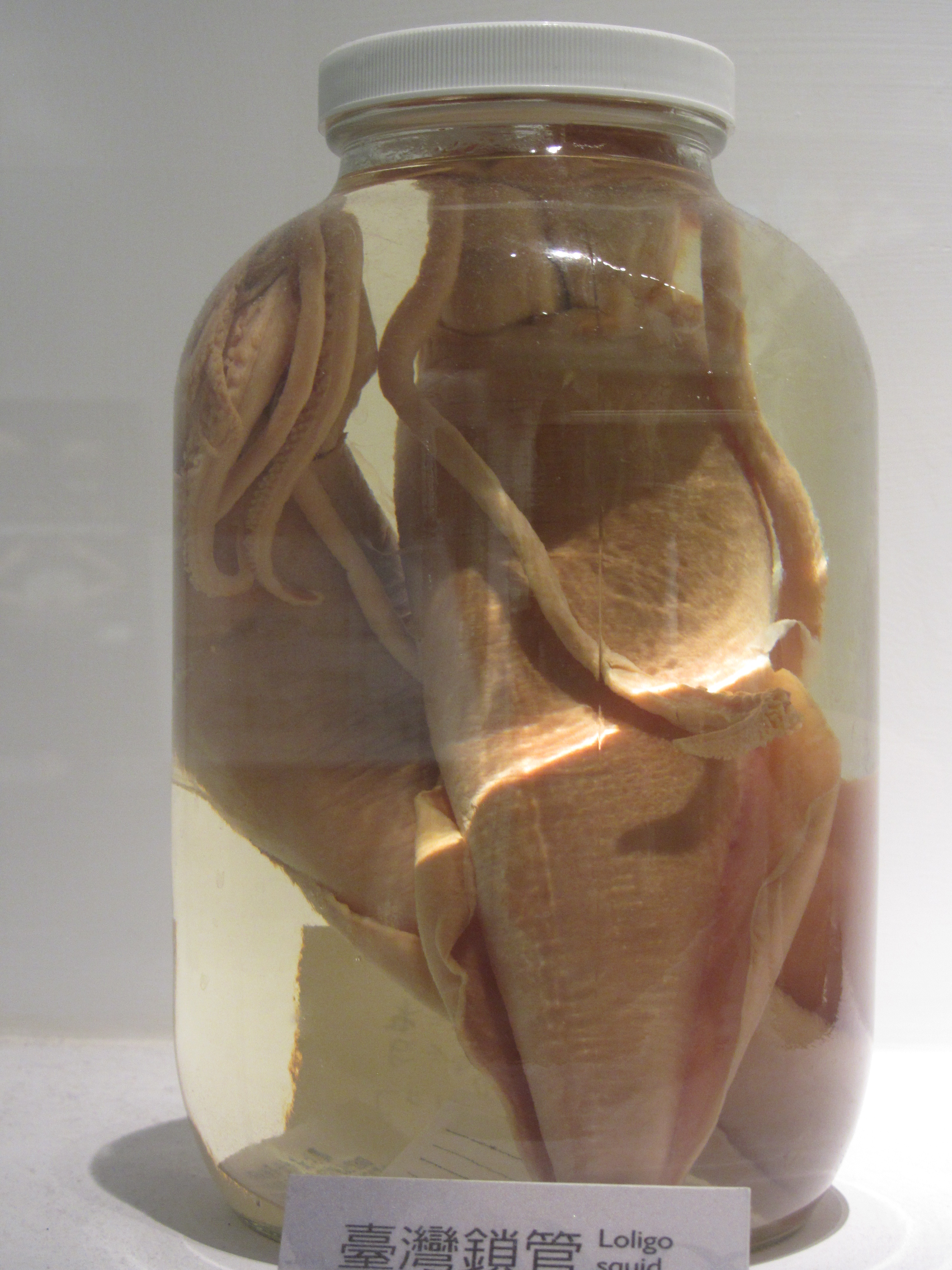

Conservation status
- Data Deficient (IUCN 3.1)

Scientific classification
- Kingdom: Animalia
- Phylum: Mollusca
- Class: Cephalopoda
- Order: Myopsida
- Family: Loliginidae
- Genus: Uroteuthis
- Species: U. chinensis

Binomial name
- Uroteuthis chinensis (Gray, 1849)

= Uroteuthis chinensis =

Species of cephalopod

Uroteuthis chinensis, also known as the Hanchi (Korean:한치),Taiwanese squid (Mandarin Chinese:台灣槍烏賊) or mitre squid, is a species of squid in the west Pacific Ocean, including the China Sea.

== Characteristics ==
U. chinesis is a cephalopod which means that it feeds by using tentacles to pull food into its sharp beak. Cephalopods have radulas which are similar to tongues that help them grind up the food they eat so they can digest it. Reproduction occurs once in a lifetime because cephalopods die shortly after reproducing. During mating the male squid uses a specialized arm called a hectocotylus to fertilize the female with his sperm. The species grows up to 490 mm (19 in) (mantle length) for males and 310 mm (12 in) for females.

The body is elongated, tapered, and the end of the tail is tapered. There is no longitudinal midline on the ventral surface. The average carcass length of mature specimens is 30 cm and the aspect ratio is 7:1. There are two fins on the side of the tube, the fins are diamond-shaped, and the length of the carcass is greater than 2/3, making the carcass of the spear look like a rocket, hence the name.

Like other calamari species, two of the ten tentacles of this species are longer, the wrist style is generally 3>4>2>1, and there are 2 rows of suckers. There are about 12 large horned rings in the horned tentacles group with an average diameter of 1/2 times larger than that of the small horned rings at the edge. The diameter of the largest horned ring is 2 times larger. The horned ring of the largest tentacle has 20-30 sharp teeth, and the arrangement is 6-12 large teeth interspersed with 1-4 small teeth.

U. chinesis can emit light, and the photophores are on both sides of the rectum and are spindle shaped. Squid are also known to be sensitive to temperature, salinity, and circulation in the water. These habitat components can affect reproduction and life cycles.

Chinese spear squid at different growth stages sometimes have different names among fishermen: they call the larvae of squid "small rolls", and the sub-adults are called "middle rolls". They are attracted to light, so fisherman can use bright lights to guide them closer to the surface of the water and closer to their boats.

== Distribution ==
The mitre squid is widely distributed throughout the Indo-West Pacific, from Northern Australia to Honshu. Genetic analysis of COI indicates that the species has one interconnected population which inhabits this region.

The squid inhabiting the seas off Northern Java and Western Kalimantan are of the same stock, based on morphometrics and genetic analysis. In contrast, squid from two locales in Central Java showed significant morphometric and meristics differences, though overlap of these features is observed.

== Reproduction ==
Uroteuthis chinensis lays egg masses, with females laying egg masses composed of over 100 "egg strings", and each string carrying nearly 100 eggs. Incubation lasts for two weeks.

== Relation to humans ==
The main fishing grounds of this species are located in the Penghu Islands on both sides of the Taiwan Strait and the South Fujian Sea, but it can also be seen in the northern part of the Beibu Gulf in Guangxi, around Hainan Island, Nanpeng Islands, and the South China Sea. The peak period of fishing is from May to June, but in Hong Kong sometimes they can be caught in April. Compared with other cuttlefish or squid, its taste is thinner and sweeter, and it is generally used to stir-fry, stir-fry or eat as sashimi. U. chinesis when compared to other squid species like U. edulis seems to grow faster and have larger mantles. This could attribute to people preferring U. chinesis over other squid species for eating.
