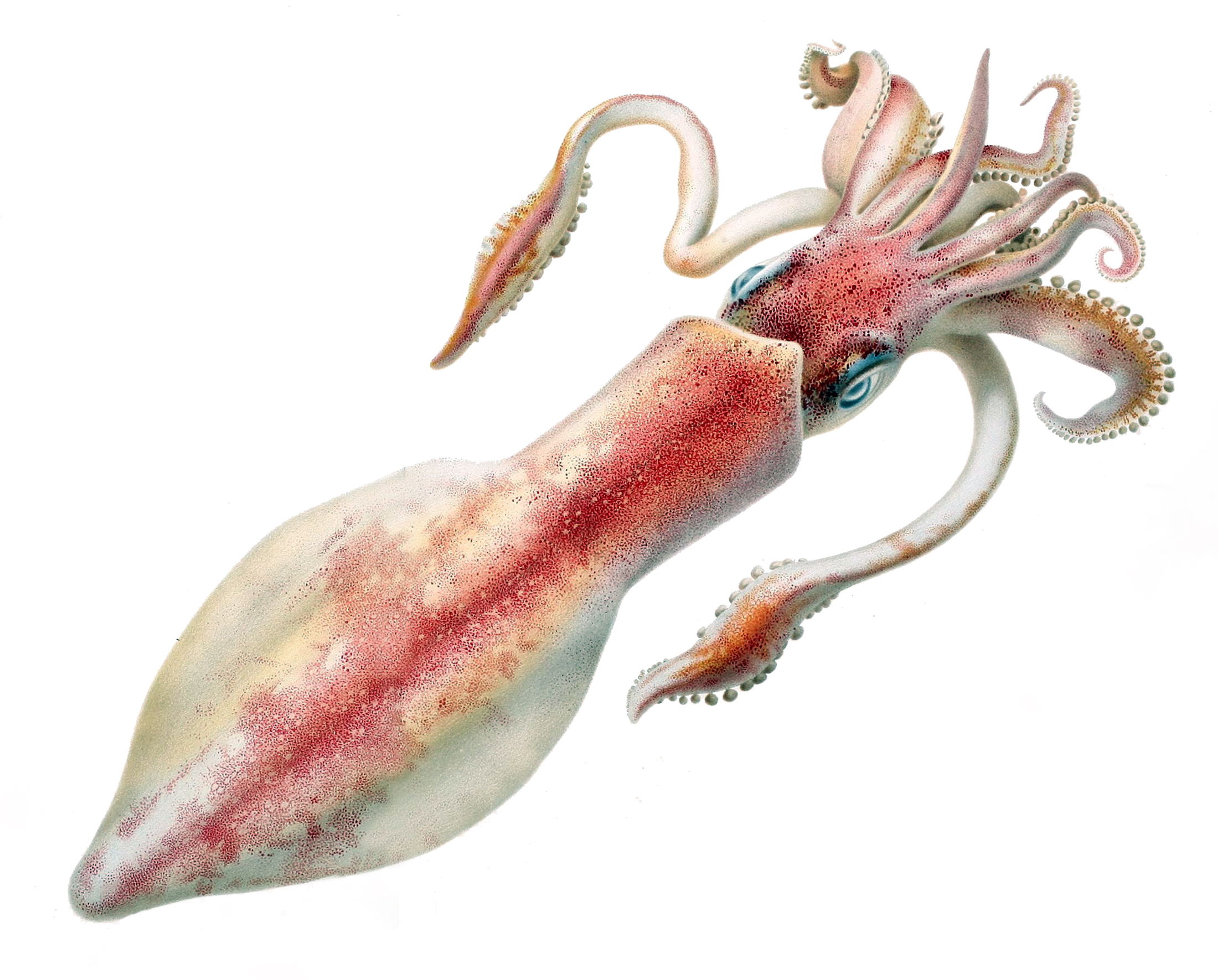

Conservation status
- Least Concern (IUCN 3.1)

Scientific classification
- Kingdom: Animalia
- Phylum: Mollusca
- Class: Cephalopoda
- Order: Myopsida
- Family: Loliginidae
- Genus: Loligo
- Species: L. forbesii

Binomial name
- Loligo forbesii Steenstrup, 1857

Synonyms
- Loligo fusus Risso, 1854; Loligo moulinsi Lafont, 1871

= Loligo forbesii =

Species of cephalopods

Loligo forbesii (sometimes erroneously spelled forbesi), known commonly as the veined squid and long-finned squid, is a commercially important species of squid in the family Loliginidae, the pencil squids.

== Description ==
This squid grows up to 90 centimetres (35 in) in mantle length. The long fins are roughly diamond-shaped and make up two thirds of the total length of the body. The colour of the squid is variable, but is usually a shade of pink, red, or brown. The vestigial shell is a small, thin internal structure.

== Distribution ==
Loligo forbesii can be found in the seas around Europe, its range extending through the Red Sea toward the East African coast. It is widespread in the Atlantic Ocean. It is one of the most common cephalopods in the Celtic Sea.

== Biology ==
The squid lives at depths of 10 to 500 metres (33 to 1,640 ft). It attains sexual maturity at about one year old and lives 1 to 2 years, with a maximum life span of about 3 years. It generally breeds only once. The male delivers sperm into the mantle of the female using structures on a specialized tentacle. The female will spawn up to 100,000 eggs, which adhere to the sea floor. Peak spawning season is in January through March off Scotland, with recruitment of juveniles occurring in the fall. Off Galicia the breeding season lasts from December to May, with most mating occurring in December through February.

The diet includes fish, polychaetes, crustaceans, and other cephalopods, often members of its own species.

== Fisheries ==
This is one of the most common squid species fished in the United Kingdom.
