= Hectocotylus =

Cephalopod sex organ for sex between cephalopods

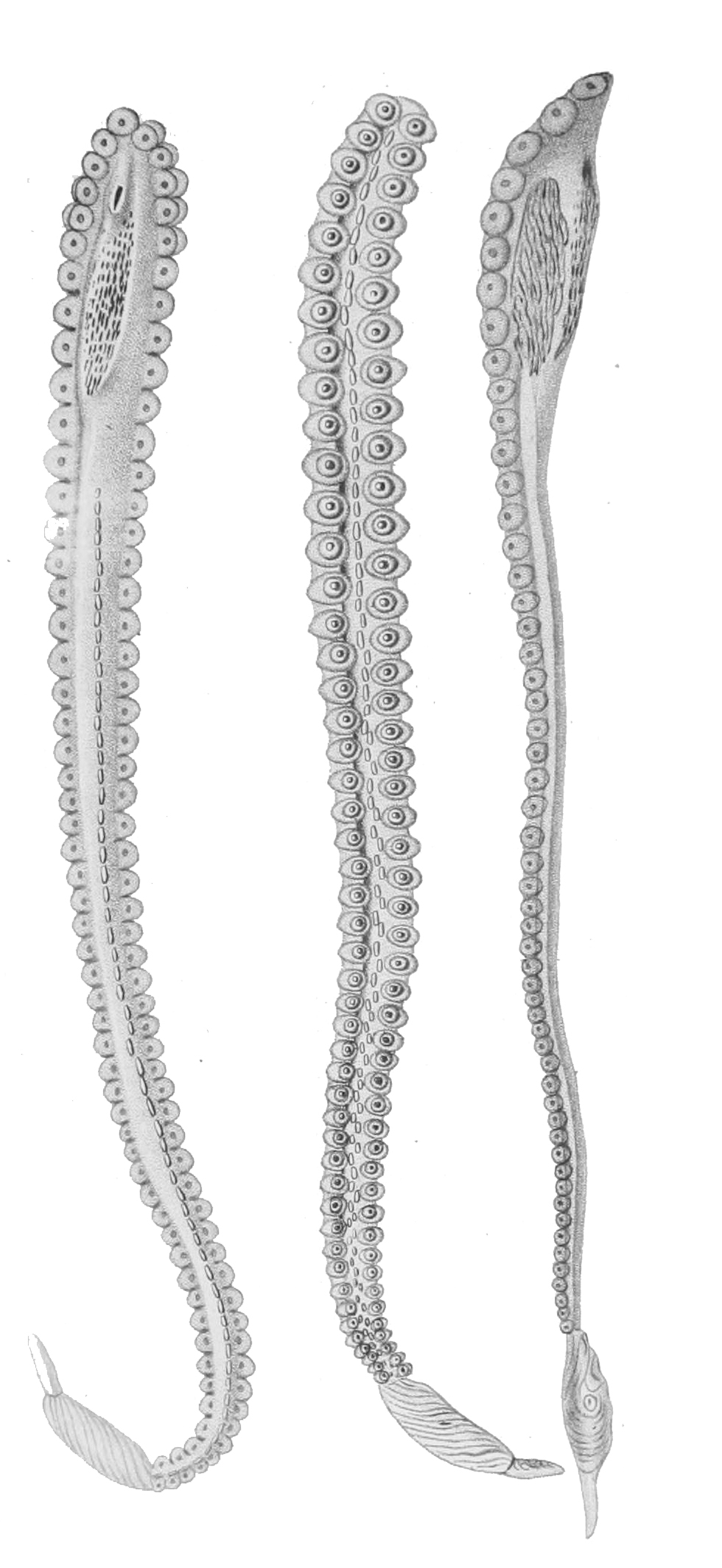
Georges Cuvier's original illustration of an octopus hectocotylus. Mistaking it for its own separate organism, he named it Hectocotyle octopodis.

A hectocotylus (pl.: hectocotyli) is one of the arms of male cephalopods that is specialized to store and transfer spermatophores to the female. Structurally, hectocotyli are muscular hydrostats. Depending on the species, the male may use it merely as a conduit to the female, analogously to a penis in other animals, or he may wrench it off and present it to the female.

The hectocotyl arm was first described in Aristotle's biological works. Although Aristotle knew of its use in mating, he was doubtful that a tentacle could deliver sperm. The name hectocotylus was devised by Georges Cuvier, who first found one embedded in the mantle of a female argonaut. Thinking it to be a parasitic worm, in 1829 Cuvier gave it a generic name (Hectocotyle), which is a New Latin term combining the Greek words for "hundred" (hec(a)to(n)) and for "hollow thing, cup" (cotyle).

== Structure ==
Generalized anatomy of squid and octopod hectocotyli:

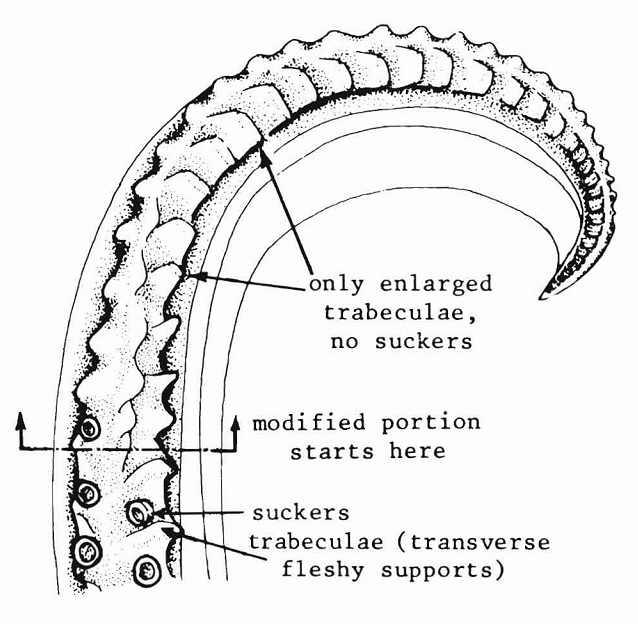
Squid

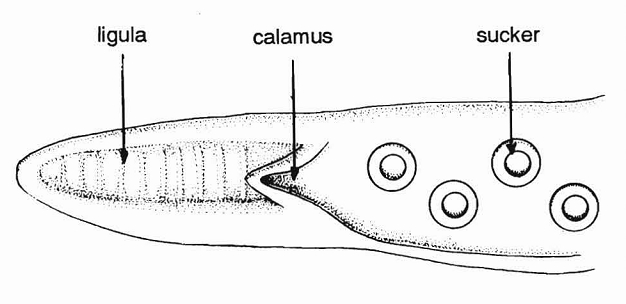
Octopod

== Variability ==
Hectocotyli are shaped in many distinctive ways, and vary considerably between species. The shape of the tip of the hectocotylus has been much used in octopus systematics.

- Many coleoids lack hectocotyli altogether.
- Among Decapodiformes (ten-limbed cephalopods), generally either one or both of arms IV are hectocotylized.
- In incirrate octopuses, it is one of arm pair III. Rare examples of double and bilateral hectocotylization have also been recorded in incirrate octopuses.
- In male seven-arm octopuses (Haliphron atlanticus), the hectocotylus develops in an inconspicuous sac in front of the right eye that gives the male the appearance of having only seven arms.
- In argonauts, the male transfers the spermatophores to the female by putting his hectocotylus into a cavity in the mantle of the female, called the pallial cavity. This is the only contact the male and female have with each other during copulation, and it can be at a distance. During copulation, the hectocotylus breaks off from the male. The funnel–mantle locking apparatus on the hectocotylus keeps it lodged in the pallial cavity of the female.

=== Table of hectocotyli ===
Illustration	Species	Family
	Abraliopsis morisi	Enoploteuthidae
	Argonauta bottgeri	Argonautidae
	Bathypolypus arcticus	Octopodidae
	Graneledone verrucosa	Octopodidae
	Haliphron atlanticus	Alloposidae
	Ocythoe tuberculata	Ocythoidae
	Scaeurgus patagiatus	Octopodidae
	Tremoctopus violaceus	Tremoctopodidae
	Uroteuthis duvauceli	Loliginidae
