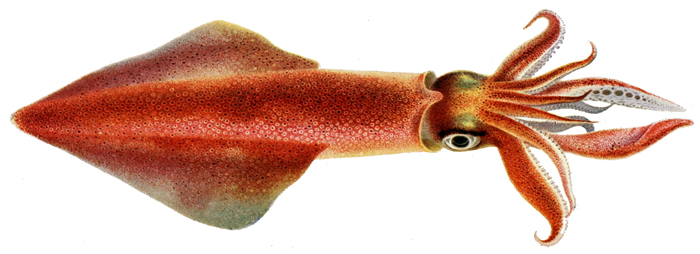
- European squid (Loligo vulgaris)

Scientific classification
- Kingdom: Animalia
- Phylum: Mollusca
- Class: Cephalopoda
- Order: Myopsida
- Family: Loliginidae; Lesueur, 1821

Genera
- See text

Synonyms
- Loligoidea Lesueur, 1821 (in part); Loligidae d'Orbigny, 1845; Loliginei Steenstrup, 1861; Pickfordiateuthidae Voss, 1953

= Loliginidae =

Loliginidae Temporal range: Cenomanian - recent

Family of squids

Loliginidae, commonly known as pencil squids, is an aquatic family of squid classified in the order Myopsida.

== Taxonomy ==
The family Loliginidae was formerly classified in the order Teuthida.

=== Taxonomic list ===
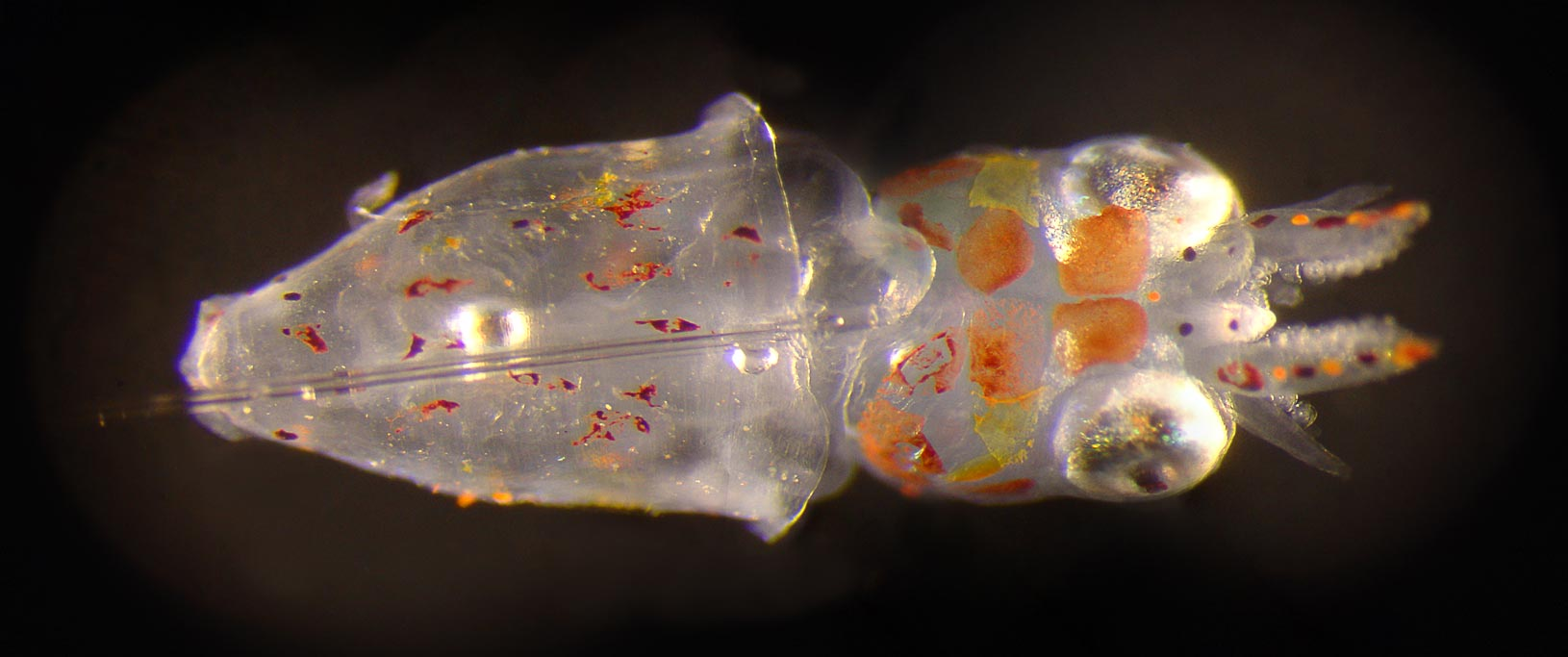
Doryteuthis opalescens paralarva

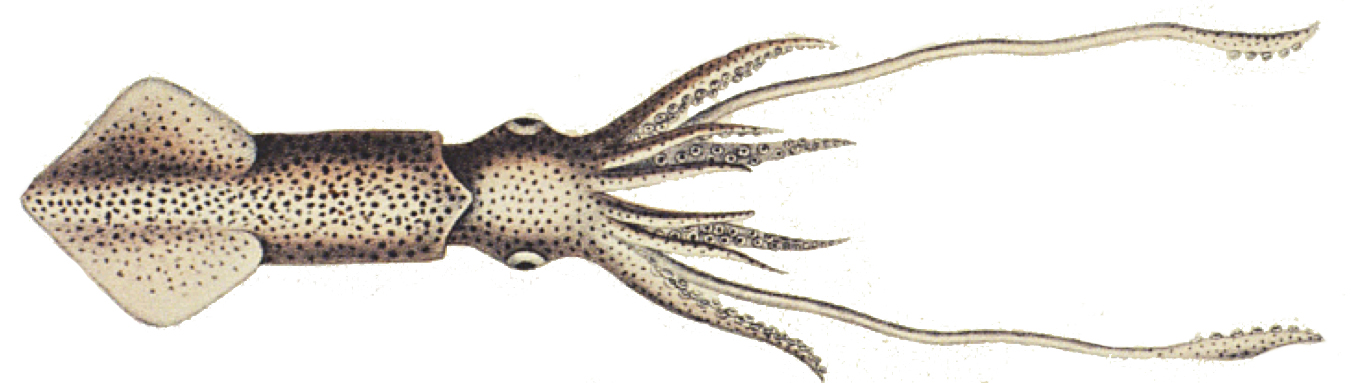
Loliolus sumatrensis

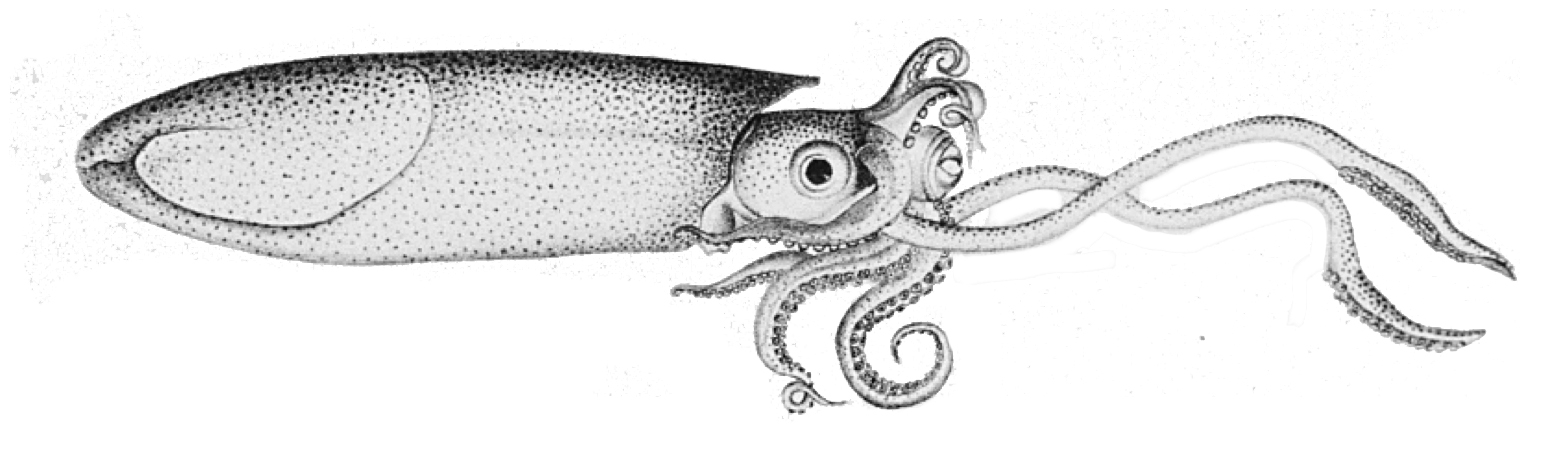
Lolliguncula brevis

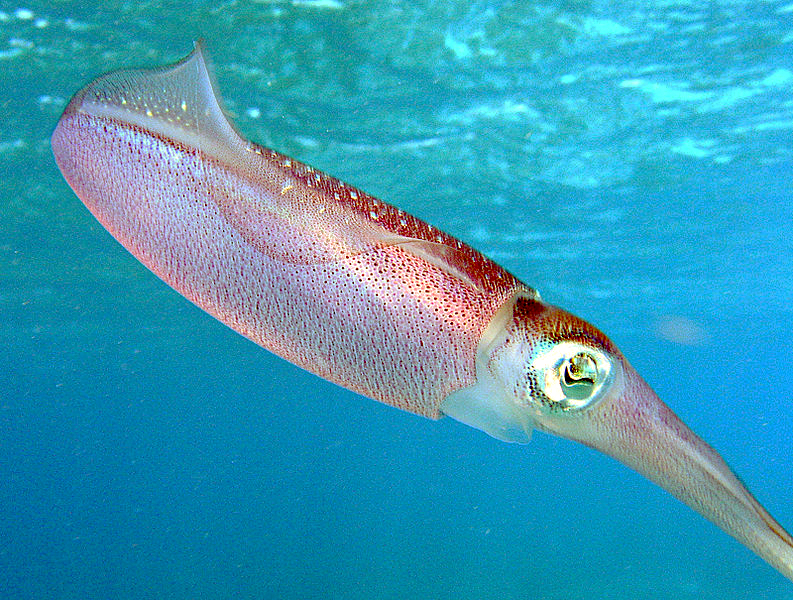
Caribbean reef squid (Sepioteuthis sepioidea)

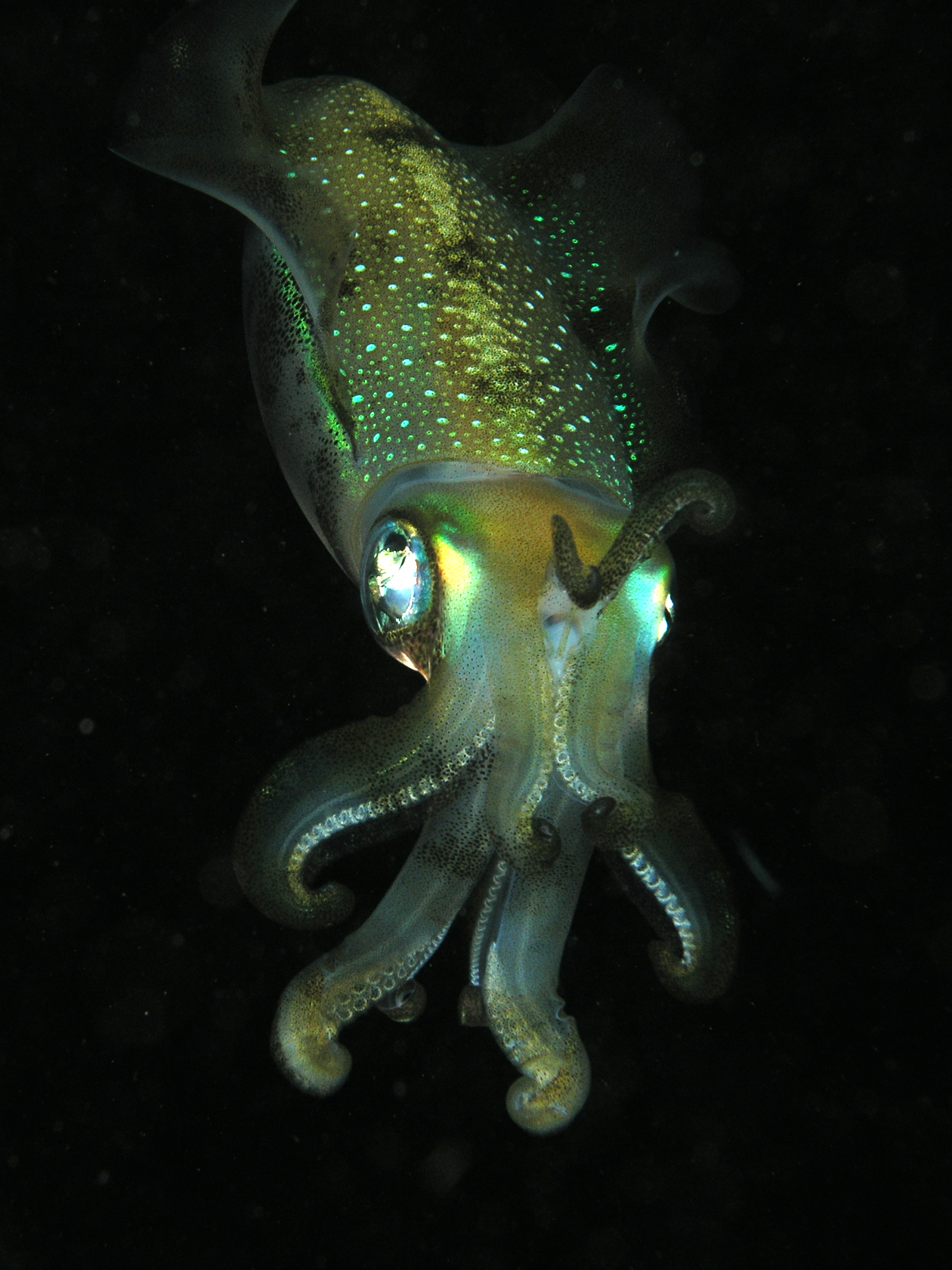
Bigfin reef squid (Sepioteuthis lessoniana)

The classification below (including 47 species) follows Vecchione et al. (2005) and the Tree of Life Web Project (2010).

Several doubtfully distinct species have also been described; see the genus articles for these.

- Genus Afrololigo
  - Afrololigo mercatoris, Guinean thumbstall squid
- Genus Alloteuthis
  - Alloteuthis africana, African squid
  - Alloteuthis media, midsize squid
  - Alloteuthis subulata, European common squid
- Genus Doryteuthis
  - Subgenus Amerigo
    - Doryteuthis gahi, Patagonian squid
    - Doryteuthis ocula, bigeye inshore squid
    - Doryteuthis opalescens, opalescent inshore squid
    - Doryteuthis pealeii, longfin inshore squid
    - Doryteuthis surinamensis, Surinam squid
  - Subgenus Doryteuthis
    - Doryteuthis plei, slender inshore squid
    - Doryteuthis roperi, Roper inshore squid
  - Subgenus unnamed
    - Doryteuthis sanpaulensis, São Paulo squid
- Genus Heterololigo
  - Heterololigo bleekeri, spear squid
- Genus Loligo
  - Loligo forbesii, veined squid
  - Loligo reynaudii, Cape Hope squid or chokka
  - Loligo vulgaris, European squid
- Genus Loliolus
  - Subgenus Loliolus
    - Loliolus affinis
    - Loliolus hardwickei
  - Subgenus Nipponololigo
    - Loliolus beka, Beka squid
    - Loliolus japonica, Japanese squid
    - Loliolus sumatrensis, Kobi squid
    - Loliolus uyii, little squid
- Genus Lolliguncula
  - Subgenus Loliolopsis
    - Lolliguncula diomedeae, dart squid or shortarm gonate squid
  - Subgenus Lolliguncula
    - Lolliguncula argus Argus brief squid
    - Lolliguncula brevis, Atlantic brief squid
    - Lolliguncula panamensis, Panama brief squid
- Genus Pickfordiateuthis
  - Pickfordiateuthis bayeri Bayer's grass squid
  - Pickfordiateuthis pulchella, grass squid
  - Pickfordiateuthis vossi Voss' grass squid
  - Pickfordiateuthis sp. A
- Genus Sepioteuthis
  - Sepioteuthis australis, southern reef squid or southern calamary
  - Sepioteuthis lessoniana, bigfin reef squid or northern calamary
  - Sepioteuthis sepioidea, Caribbean reef squid
- Genus Uroteuthis
  - Subgenus Aestuariolus
    - Uroteuthis noctiluca, luminous bay squid
  - Subgenus Photololigo
    - Uroteuthis abulati
    - Uroteuthis arabica
    - Uroteuthis bengalensis
    - Uroteuthis chinensis, mitre squid
    - Uroteuthis duvaucelii, Indian squid
    - Uroteuthis edulis, swordtip squid
    - Uroteuthis robsoni
    - Uroteuthis sibogae, Siboga squid
    - Uroteuthis singhalensis, long barrel squid
    - Uroteuthis vossi
  - Subgenus Uroteuthis
    - Uroteuthis bartschi, Bartsch's squid
  - Subgenus incertae sedis
    - Uroteuthis pickfordae, Siboga squid
    - Uroteuthis reesi

==== Fossil taxa ====
In 2025, numerous Cretaceous-aged fossil loliginids, dating back to the earliest Cenomanian, were identified from fossil beaks preserved in the Yezo Group of Hokkaido, Japan. The following genera were described.

- Genus †Psiloteuthis
  - Psiloteuthis naucrates
  - Psiloteuthis atalante
  - Psiloteuthis sculptus
  - Psiloteuthis transitus
- Genus †Streptopteryx
  - Streptopteryx glabra
  - Streptopteryx bidentata
- Genus †Camptoteuthis
  - Camptoteuthis acrorhynchus
  - Camptoteuthis cunabuli
