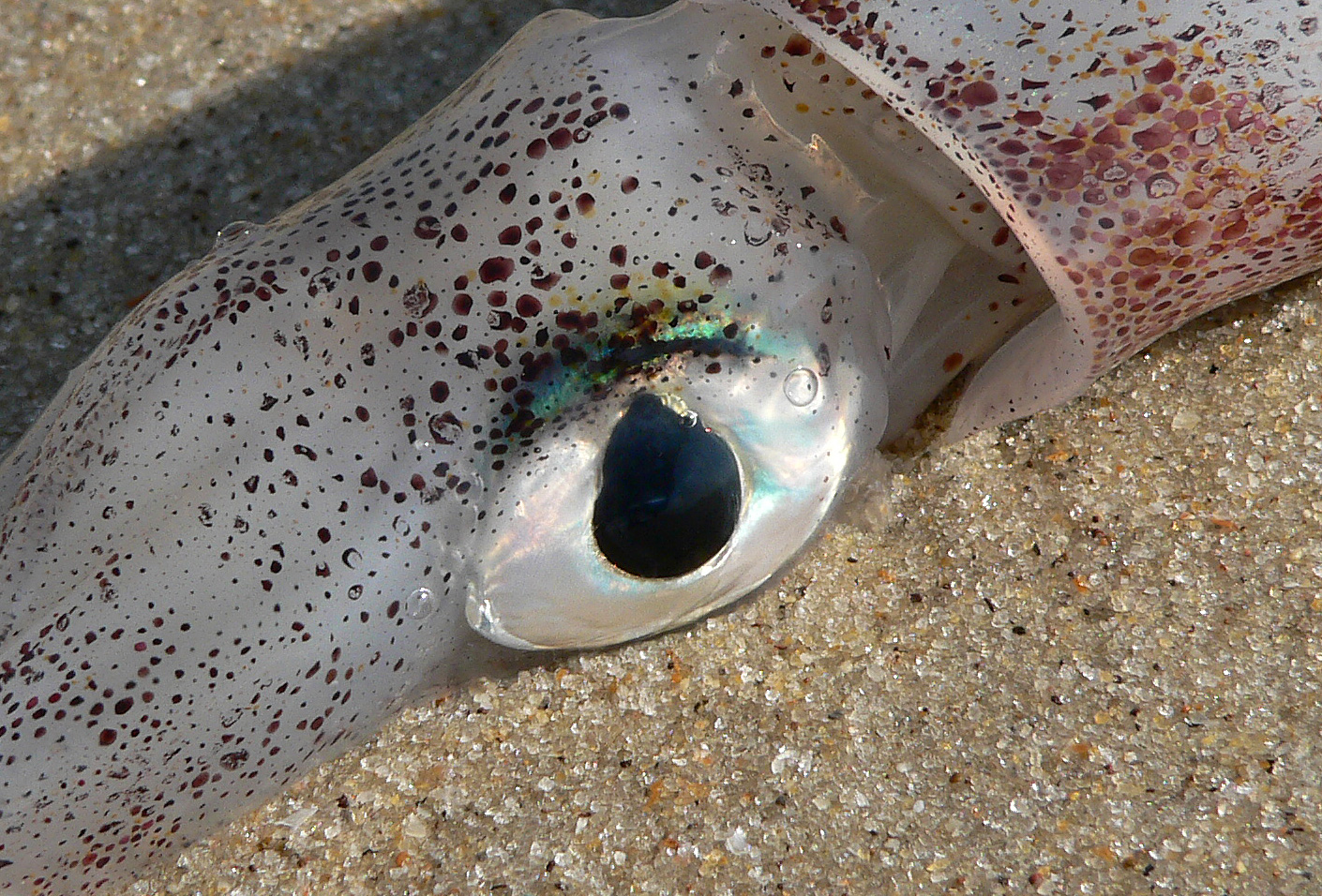
- Eye of myopsid squid showing corneal membrane and lack of secondary eyelid

Scientific classification
- Kingdom: Animalia
- Phylum: Mollusca
- Class: Cephalopoda
- Superorder: Decapodiformes
- Order: Myopsida d'Orbigny, 1841

Families
- Australiteuthidae; Loliginidae

= Myopsida =

Myopsida Temporal range: Cenomanian - recent, possible Jurassic records?

Order of squids

Myopsida is one of the four orders of squid. It consists of two families: the monotypic Australiteuthis and the diverse and commercially important Loliginidae (~50 species). Some taxonomists classify this taxon as a suborder of the order Teuthida, in which case it is known as Myopsina. This reclassification is due to Myopsina and Oegopsina not being demonstrated to form a clade.

A number of morphological features distinguish members of Myopsida from those of its sister group, Oegopsida. Some of the most obvious differences are found in the structure of the eyes: those of myopsid squids lack a secondary eyelid and are instead covered by a transparent corneal membrane, the opening of which is reduced to a microscopic anterior pore in most species. The arms and tentacles are ornamented with simple suckers (hooks are never present), with additional suckers usually borne on the buccal lappets. The carpal ("wrist") portion of the tentacular club lacks a locking apparatus, and a tentacle pocket is present on the head. The funnel has no lateral adductor muscles. An internalised shell is present in the form of a well-developed gladius, which is located dorsally within the mantle and extends for almost its entire length. In contrast to oegopsids, females possess accessory nidamental glands in addition to the main nidamental glands. They however lack a right oviduct.

Myopsids are found in coastal waters worldwide. They are demersal, generally feeding on or near the bottom. In turn, they are considered prey items by virtually all marine predators, including birds.

Adult sizes range from the dwarf Australiteuthis and Pickfordiateuthis, whose males mature at less than 2 cm (0.79 in) in mantle length (ML), to the largest species Loligo forbesii, which has been measured to 93.7 cm (3.07 ft) ML.

Until 2025, the earliest fossils of this group were Loligo statoliths from the early Eocene of North America. In 2025, numerous well-preserved fossil beaks, identifiable to several new genera in the Loliginidae, were described from the Late Cretaceous of Japan, dating back to the earliest Cenomanian. In addition, a pyritized Loligo fossil is known from the Oligocene of Russia, marking the earliest true squid known from a complete body fossil.
