= A. africana =

A. africana may refer to:

- Acatochaeta africana, a picture-winged fly species
- Actophilornis africana, the African jacana, a bird species
- Afzelia africana, an African tree of the legume family
- Alloteuthis africana, the African squid, a squid species
- Aloe africana, South African endemic succulent
- Ameles africana, a praying mantis species found in Algeria, Morocco, Corsica, Dalmatia, Sardinia, Sicily and Portugal
- Ampelocissus africana, the Rogon daji or Lanbi, a woody vine or liana of the grape family
- Ansellia africana, the African ansellia or leopard orchid, an orchid species
- Aquila africana, the Cassin's hawk-eagle, a bird of prey species
- Aristea africana, a flowering plant species in the genus Aristea

== Synonyms ==
- Anhinga africana, a synonym for Anhinga rufa, the African darter or snakebird, a water bird species of tropical sub-Saharan Africa

== See also ==
- Africana (disambiguation)
- A. africanus (disambiguation)
