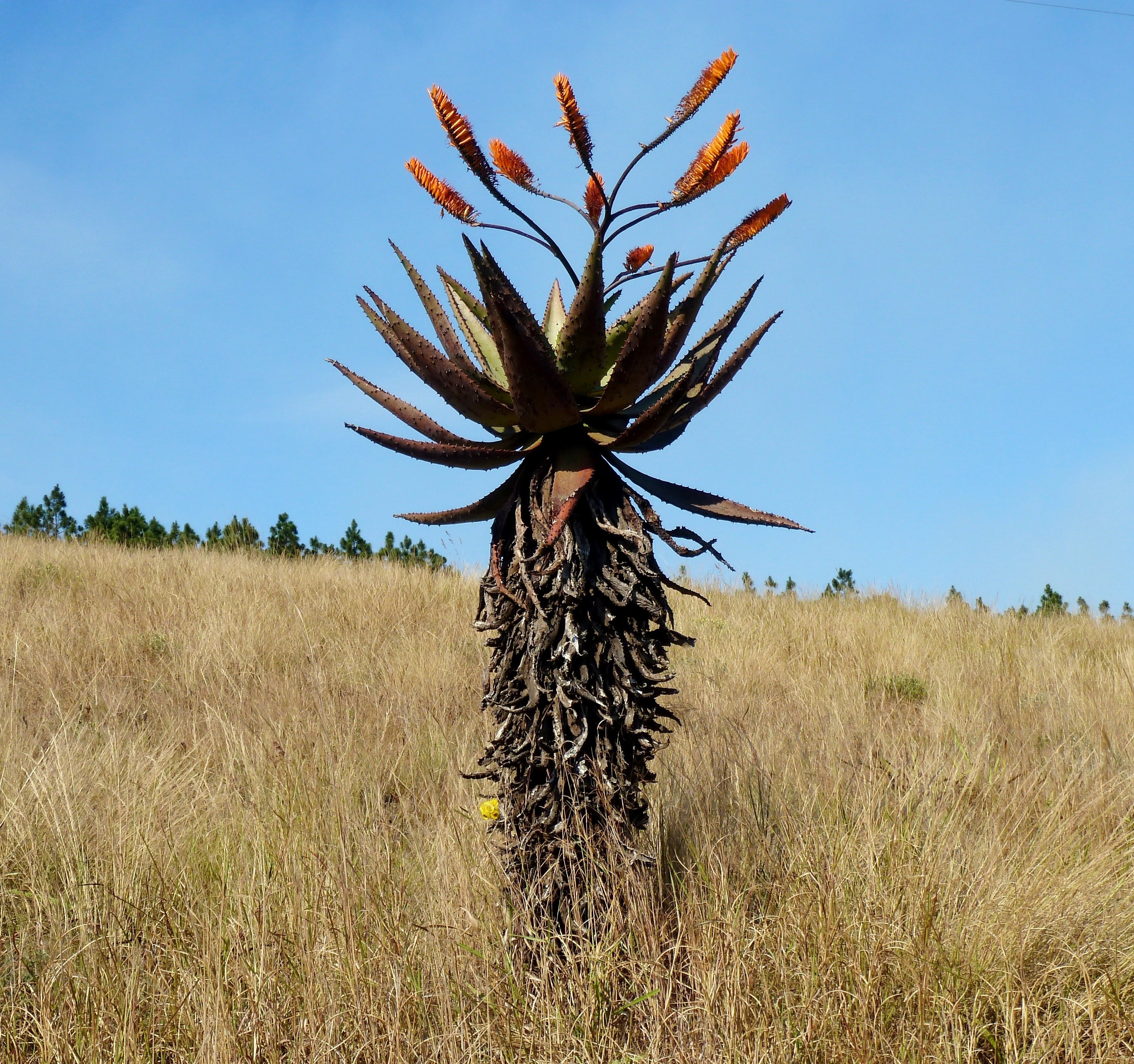

Conservation status
- Least Concern (IUCN 3.1)
- CITES Appendix II

Scientific classification
- Kingdom: Plantae
- Clade: Tracheophytes
- Clade: Angiosperms
- Clade: Monocots
- Order: Asparagales
- Family: Asphodelaceae
- Subfamily: Asphodeloideae
- Genus: Aloe
- Species: A. marlothii

Binomial name
- Aloe marlothii A.Berger

= Aloe marlothii =

Species of flowering plant

Aloe marlothii (also known as the mountain aloe or the flat-flowered aloe) is a large, single-stemmed Southern African aloe of rocky places and open flat country, occasionally growing up to 6 metres (20 ft) tall.

== Description ==
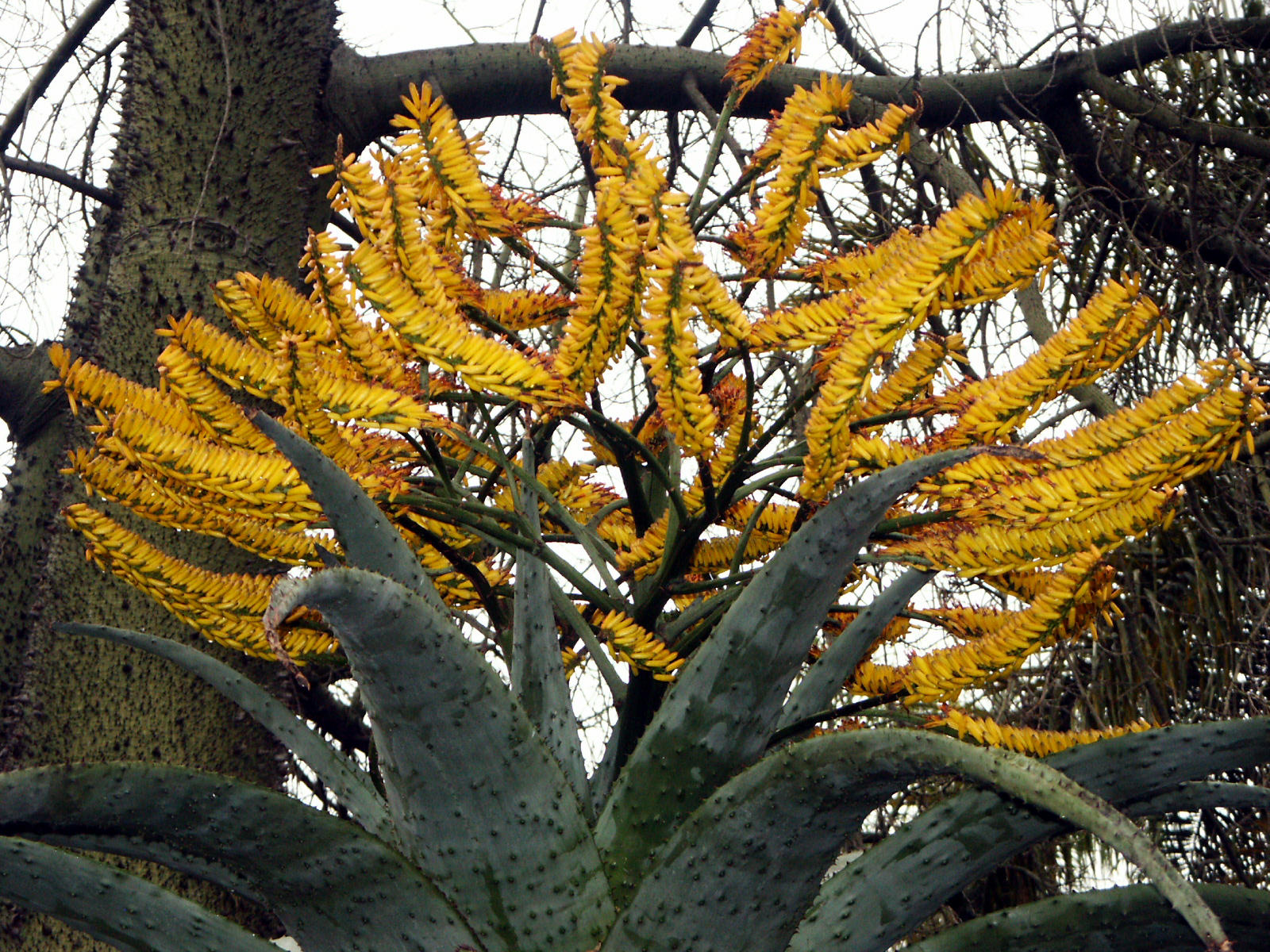
Aloe marlothii in flower, showing the uniquely horizontal racemes of the inflorescence

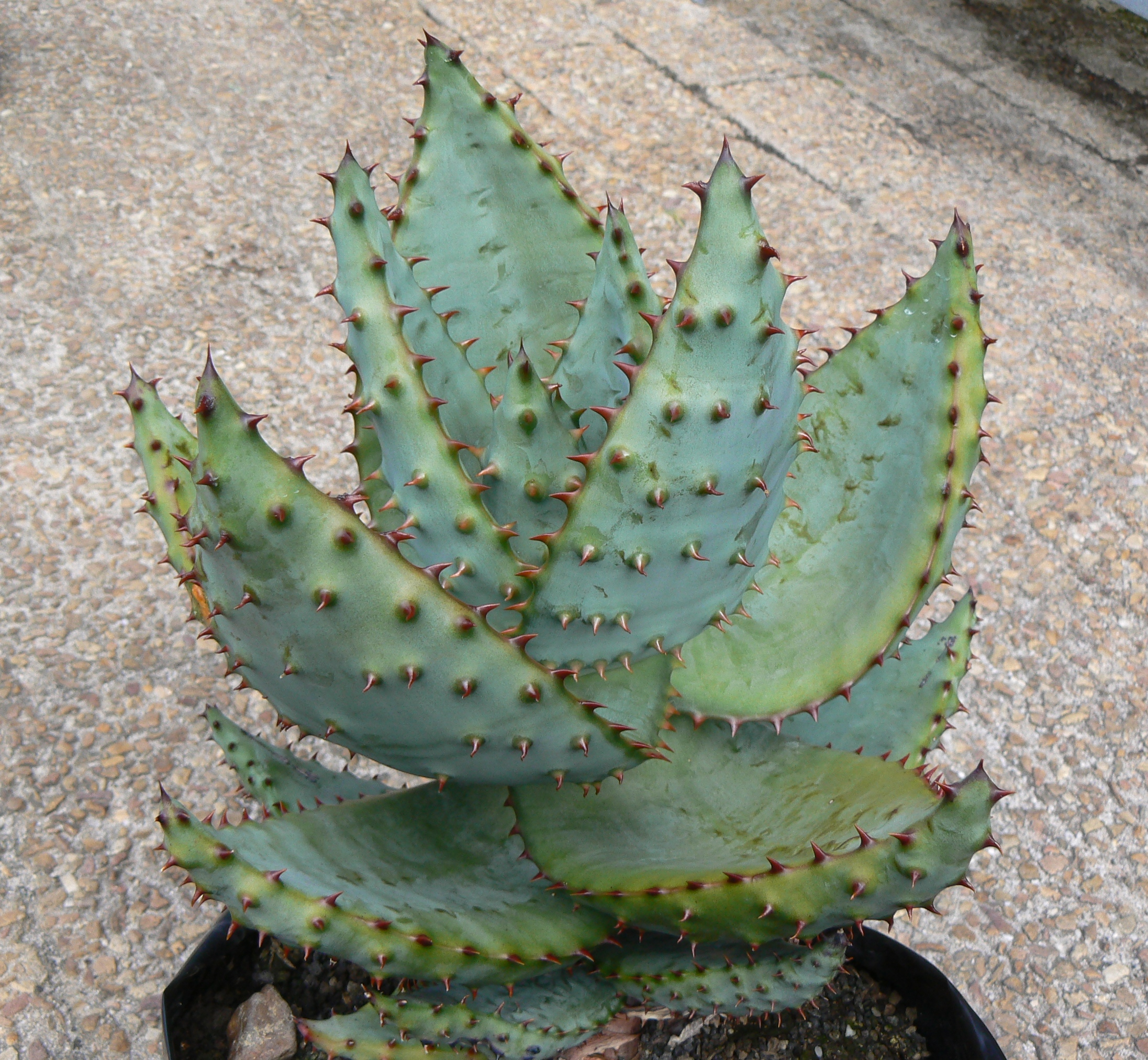
Like many aloe species, Aloe marlothii is more spiny when it is small and vulnerable to grazing.

Named after Rudolf Marloth, a German-born South African botanist, this species of aloe has an especially large robust head of stiff, grey-green leaves. These leaves can be up to 1.8 m (5 ft 11 in) long, 30 cm (12 in) wide, and about 4 cm (1.6 in) thick, and usually densely covered in short spines on the convex lower surfaces and less so on the concave upper surfaces. Like many other arborescent aloe species, this aloe is more spiny when it is small and as it becomes taller and less vulnerable to grazing, it loses many of the spines from its leaf surfaces. It normally has a trunk densely covered by the withered old leaves.

The inflorescence is a much-branched panicle with up to 30 or exceptionally 50 racemes. Flower colour varies a great deal, and ranges from yellow through orange (most common) to bright red. Flowering takes place through the winter months, as is the case with most aloes.

The distinctively horizontal branches of its inflorescence is an easy way to distinguish this species from other aloes. For this reason it is sometimes known as the flat-flowered aloe. However, the type known as Aloe spectabilis, has taller, less horizontal inflorescences. The densely packed flowers all tend to point upwards from the raceme.

When not in flower, it is easily confused with the closely related Aloe excelsa (Zimbabwe aloe), and with the similar-looking Aloe ferox (Cape aloe) and Aloe africana (African aloe) species to the south.

== Distribution ==
Its distribution ranges from the Klipriviersberg Nature Reserve in Johannesburg, through eastern Botswana, northwards over the Soutpansberg to Zimbabwe and Malawi and eastwards through Eswatini and Mozambique to the coast. Within this range, it is especially common in mountainous areas, which led it to be known as the mountain aloe.

This species grades through intermediate forms into Aloe spectabilis Reynolds of KwaZulu-Natal. Aloe marlothii used to form natural hybrids with some 30 or more species.

== See also ==
- List of Southern African indigenous trees
