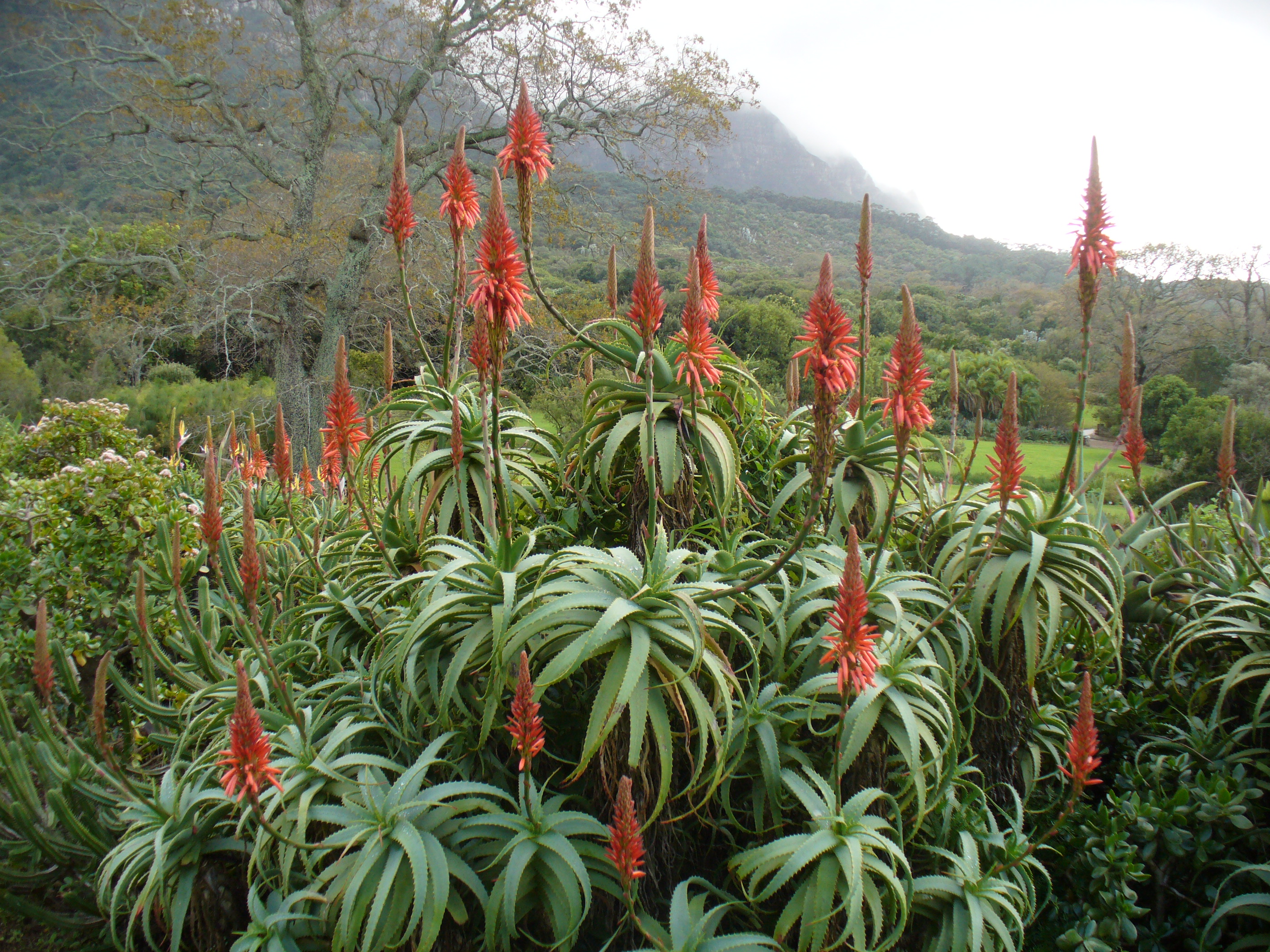
- A. arborescens growing in Kirstenbosch National Botanical Garden, Cape Town, South Africa
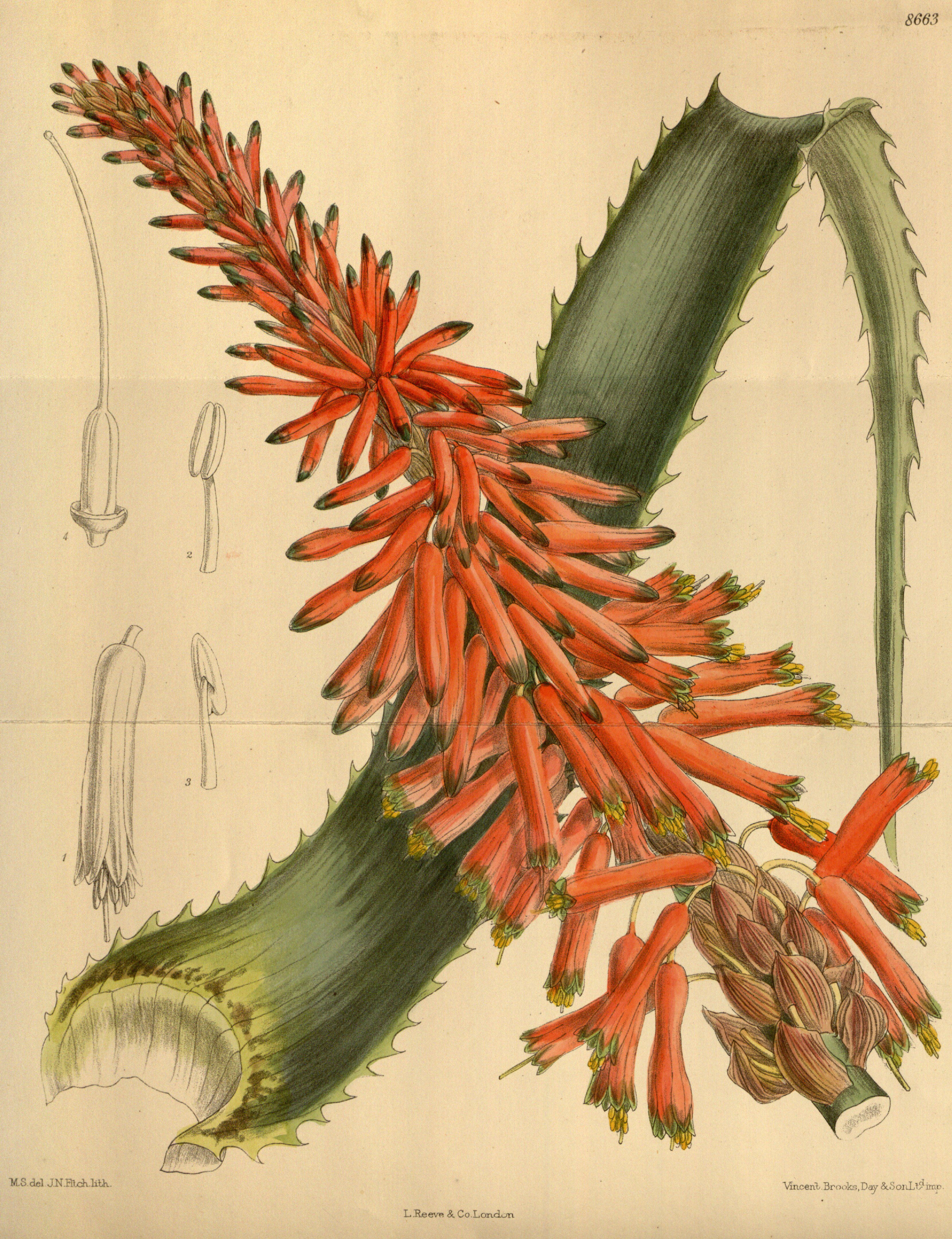
- Aloe arborescens Curtis's Botanical Magazine

Conservation status
- Least Concern (IUCN 3.1)
- CITES Appendix II

Scientific classification
- Kingdom: Plantae
- Clade: Tracheophytes
- Clade: Angiosperms
- Clade: Monocots
- Order: Asparagales
- Family: Asphodelaceae
- Subfamily: Asphodeloideae
- Genus: Aloe
- Species: A. arborescens

Binomial name
- Aloe arborescens Mill.
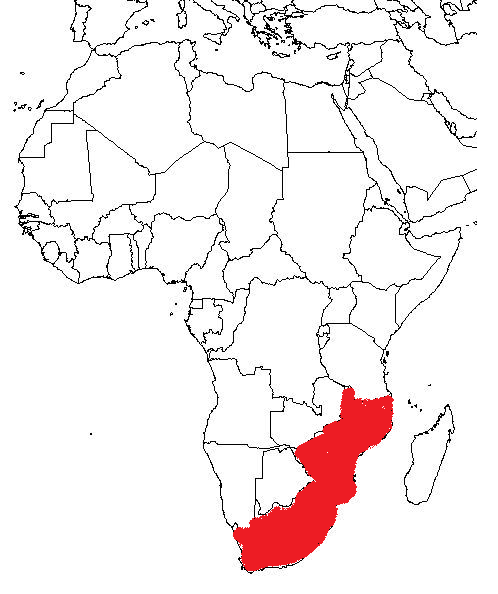
- Distribution of Aloe arborescens

= Aloe arborescens =

Species of succulent

Aloe arborescens, commonly known as krantz aloe or the candelabra aloe, is a species of flowering succulent perennial plant that belongs to the genus Aloe, which it shares with the well known and studied Aloe vera. The specific epithet arborescens means "tree-like". Aloe arborescens is valued by gardeners for its succulent green leaves, large vibrantly-colored flowers, winter blooming, and attraction for birds, bees, and butterflies.

== Description ==
Aloe arborescens is a large, multi-headed, sprawling succulent, and its specific name indicates that it sometimes reaches tree size. A typical height for this species is 2–3 metres (6.6–9.8 ft) high. Its leaves are succulent and are green with a slight blue tint. Its leaves have small spikes along its edges and are arranged in rosettes situated at the end of branches. Flowers are arranged in a type of inflorescence called a raceme. The racemes are not branched but two to several can sprout from each rosette. Flowers are cylindrical in shape and are a vibrant red-orange color.

Taxonomically, it forms part of the Arborescentes series of very closely related Aloe species, together with Aloe pluridens and Aloe mutabilis.

== Distribution ==
Aloe arborescens is endemic to the south eastern part of Southern Africa. Specifically, this range includes the countries of South Africa, Malawi, Mozambique, and Zimbabwe. It has the third largest distribution amongst the aloe genus. Although Aloe arborescens has adapted to many different habitats, its natural habitat usually consists of mountainous areas, including rocky outcrops and exposed ridges. Its common name krantz aloe refers to the Afrikaans word "krans" (spelling possibly influenced by German "Kranz"), which means a rocky cliff. Its habitat can vary, and it is one of only a few species of aloe that is found growing from sea level up to the tops of mountains.

It is also widely distributed (to the point of becoming naturalized) in the western Mediterranean, Australia, California, Japan, South Korea and the Marshall Islands. It is an invasive species in Portugal.

== Cultivation ==
Aloe arborescens is valued by gardeners for its succulent green leaves, large vibrantly-colored flowers, and winter blooming. The sweet nectar attracts birds, butterflies, and bees. With a minimum temperature of 10 °C (50 °F), in temperate regions it is grown under glass. The cultivar A. arborescens 'Variegata' has gained the Royal Horticultural Society's Award of Garden Merit. In Southern Africa, Aloe arborescens is traditionally planted around kraals (domestic stock enclosures) as a living fence or security hedge. It often happens that the position of old kraals can still be seen many years after they have been abandoned, because the aloes persist. It is easily propagated by cuttings.

== Gallery ==
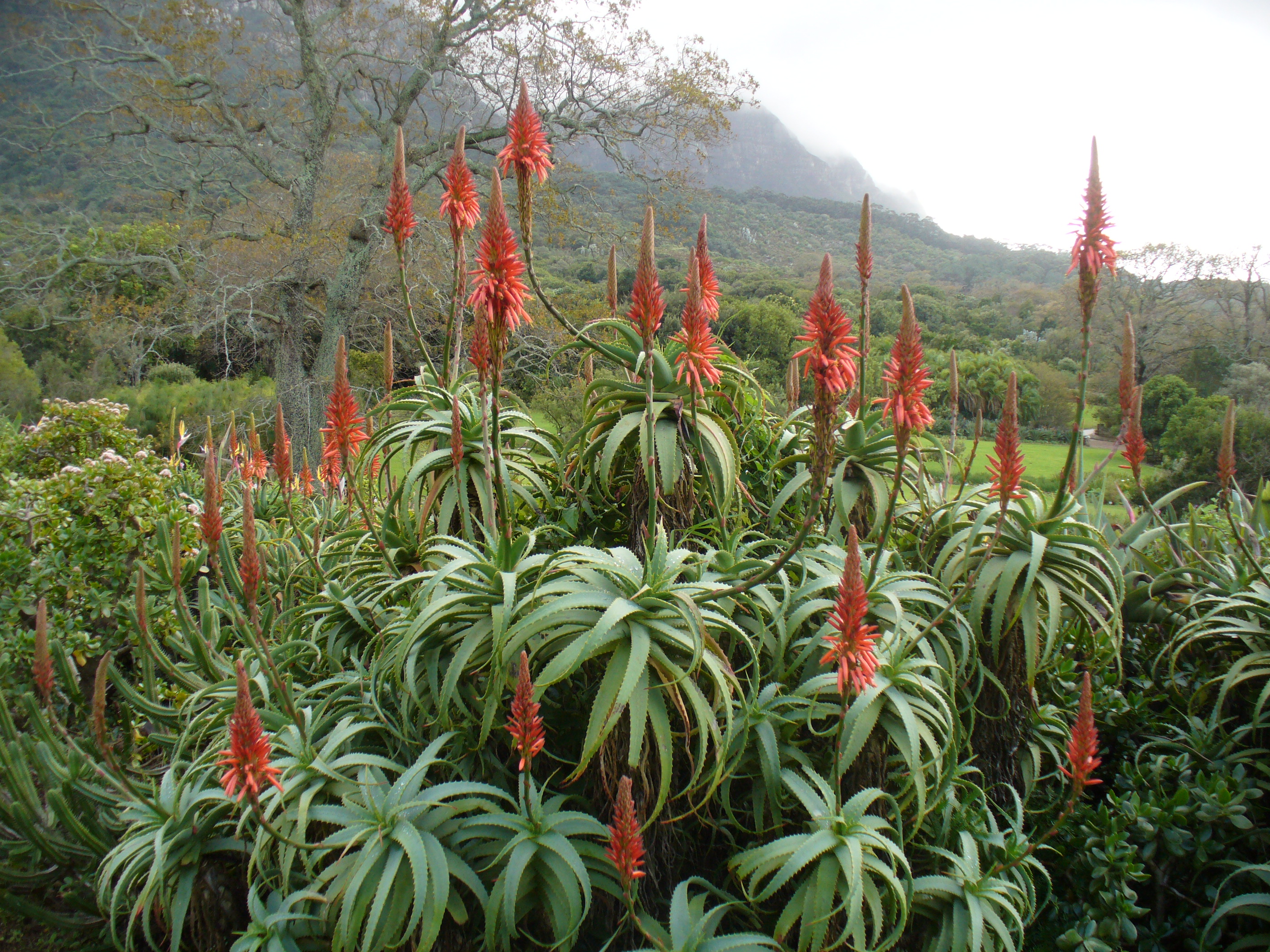
Krantz aloes in the veld.

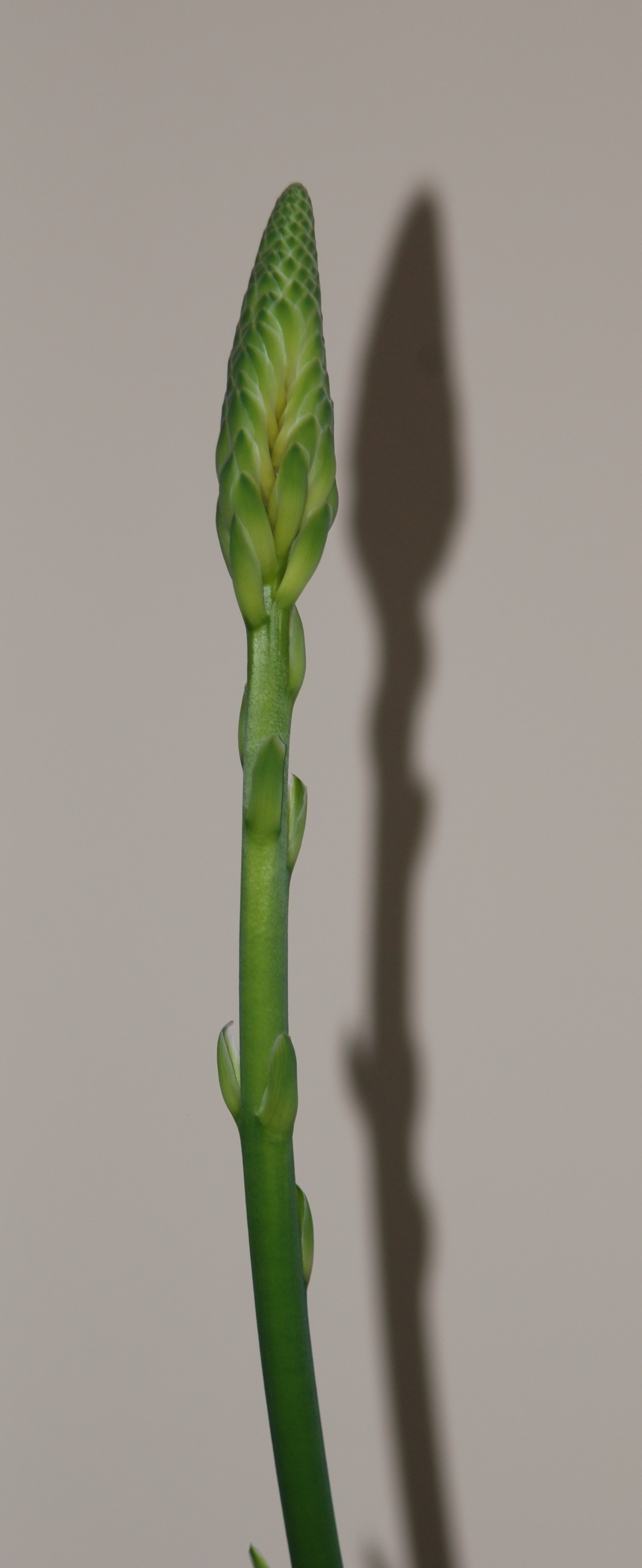
Flower bud, before opening.

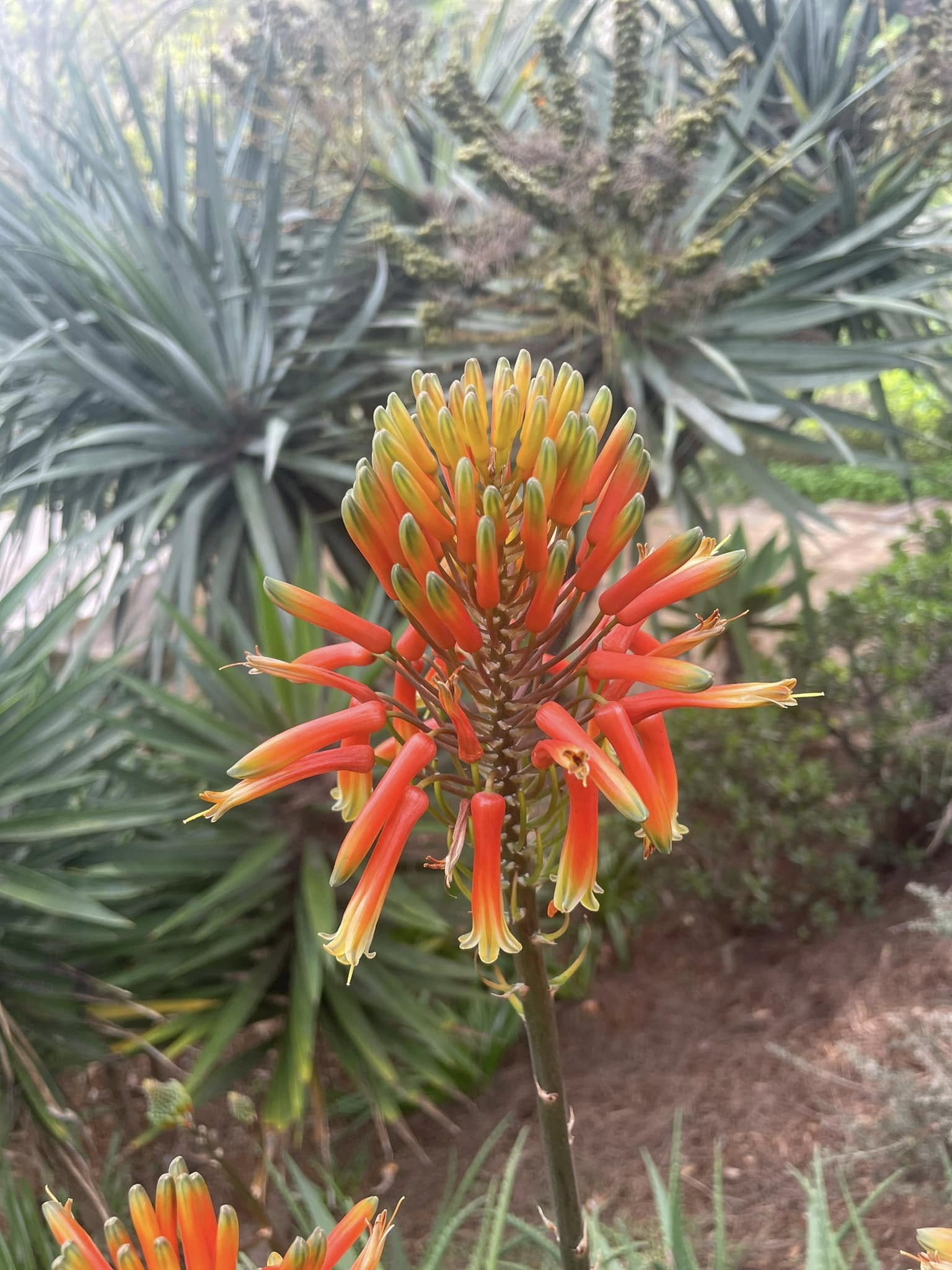
After sprouting open.
