= A. africanus =

A. africanus may refer to:

An abbreviation of a species name. In binomial nomenclature the name of a species is always the name of the genus to which the species belongs, followed by the species name (also called the species epithet). In A. africanus the genus name has been abbreviated to A. and the species has been spelled out in full. In a document that uses this abbreviation it should always be clear from the context which genus name has been abbreviated.

== Canonical names ==
Some of the most common uses of A. africanus are:

- Aedes africanus, a mosquito species
- Agapanthus africanus, the African lily, a plant species native of the Cape of Good Hope in South Africa
- Atherurus africanus, the African brush-tailed porcupine, a rat-like Old World porcupine species
- Australopithecus africanus, an early hominid, an australopithecine who lived between 2-3 million years ago in the Pliocene

== Synonyms ==
- Androniscus africanus, a synonym for Androniscus dentiger, a woodlouse species
- Atelopus africanus, a synonym for Werneria preussi, a toad species found in Togo and Cameroon

== See also ==
- A. africana (disambiguation)
- Africanus (disambiguation)
