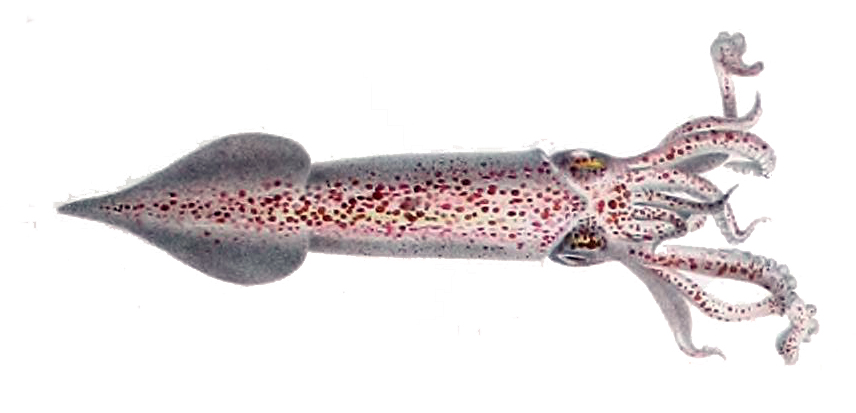
- Alloteuthis media

Scientific classification
- Kingdom: Animalia
- Phylum: Mollusca
- Class: Cephalopoda
- Order: Myopsida
- Family: Loliginidae
- Genus: Alloteuthis; Wülker, 1920

Type species
- Sepia media Linnaeus, 1758

Synonyms
- Acrololigo Grimpe, 1921; Acruroteuthis Berry, 1920; Loligo (Alloteuthis) Wülker, 1920

= Alloteuthis =

Genus of squids

Alloteuthis is a genus of squids from the pencil squid family Loliginidae which has been considered a subgenus of the genus Loligo but both molecular analyses and morphological-anatomical analyses support the separation of these two taxa.

== Species ==
Alloteuthis as currently recognised comprises three species:

- Alloteuthis africana Adam, 1950, African squid
- Alloteuthis media (Linnaeus, 1758), middlesize squid
- Alloteuthis subulata (Lamarck, 1798), European common squid
