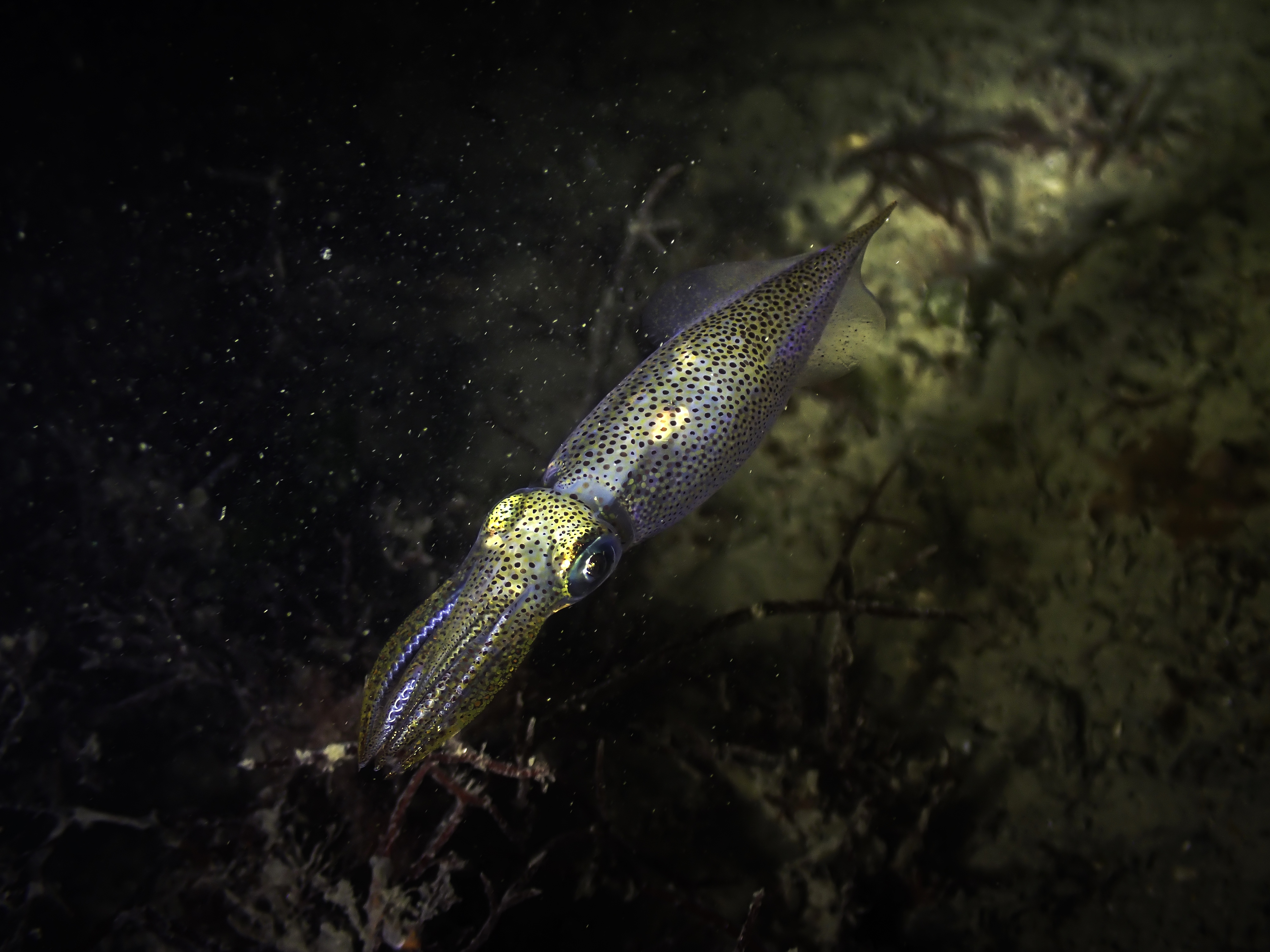

Conservation status
- Data Deficient (IUCN 3.1)

Scientific classification
- Kingdom: Animalia
- Phylum: Mollusca
- Class: Cephalopoda
- Order: Myopsida
- Family: Loliginidae
- Genus: Alloteuthis
- Species: A. subulata

Binomial name
- Alloteuthis subulata (Lamarck, 1798)

Synonyms
- Loligo subulata Lamarck, 1798; Sepia subulata Bosc, 1802; Sepiola subalata Eydoux in Gervais & Beneden, 1838

= Alloteuthis subulata =

European common squid

Species of squid

Alloteuthis subulata, the European common squid, is a species of squid in the family Loliginidae.

== Distribution ==
Alloteuthis subulata is found in the eastern Atlantic Ocean as far south as North-west Africa, the North Sea, the western Baltic Sea, and Mediterranean Sea. In British waters, it has a southernly bias to its distribution but has been found as far north as the Solway Firth and the Firth of Clyde.

== Description ==
Colours of European common squid

Alloteuthis subulata has a long, narrow mantle with a long tail which is pointed in adult females and even longer and rather spike-like in adult males. The fins are rhomboid-shaped, with pointed sides, and their rear ends are concave and extend along the tail. The short tentacles are delicate, with small, narrow clubs. Its color is normally pale grey with many brown or purplish spots.

Length is up to 21 cm and the maximum mantle length is 14 cm.

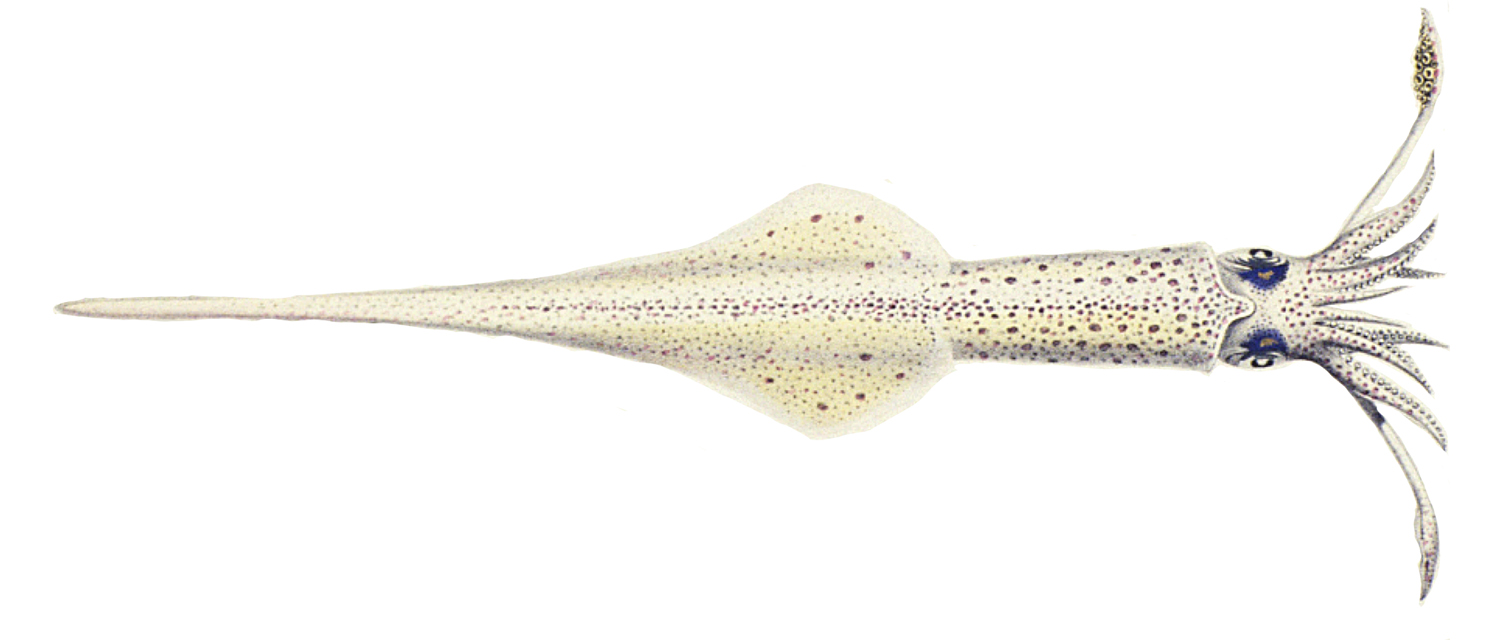
Drawing.

== Habitat ==
Alloteuthis subulata is usually associated with the water column above sandy and hard bottoms.

== Biology ==
The males and females arrive together in inshore waters of the North Sea in early summer. The spawning season is restricted to June and July. Eggs are covered in gel and laid in strings, which are attached to hard objects on the seabed. The eggs hatch after about 2 weeks when the juveniles are 2 mm long. They first appear in plankton samples towards the end of July; after about 15 to 30 days, they switch to a demersal mode of life.

In November, when they are 3 months old and about 3 cm in length, they move out of the North Sea, returning the following spring, by which time they will have attained a length of about 5 cm. The life expectancy is between 1 and 2 years.

The species feeds on small and juvenile fishes.

== Fisheries ==
Alloteuthis subulata is normally taken as bycatch in trawl fisheries for other species throughout its range. In the Mediterranean Sea, the species is normally caught between 20 and 120 m depth over sandy-muddy substrates. Squid so caught may be marketed fresh and frozen. There are no separate statistics reported for this species, as catches are not reported separately from Alloteuthis media.
