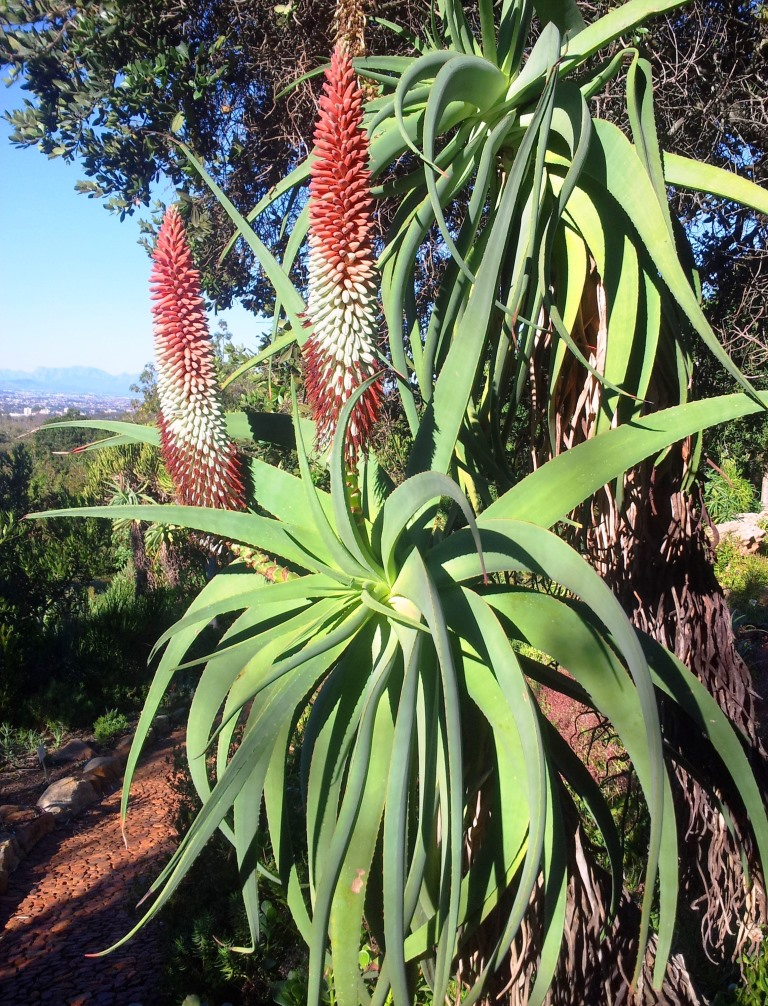
- Aloe speciosa in flower

Conservation status
- CITES Appendix II (CITES)

Scientific classification
- Kingdom: Plantae
- Clade: Tracheophytes
- Clade: Angiosperms
- Clade: Monocots
- Order: Asparagales
- Family: Asphodelaceae
- Subfamily: Asphodeloideae
- Genus: Aloe
- Species: A. speciosa

Binomial name
- Aloe speciosa Baker

= Aloe speciosa =

Tilt-head aloe

Species of plant

Aloe speciosa is a species of flowering plant in the Asphodelaceae family. It is commonly called tilt-head aloe and is an arborescent aloe indigenous to the thicket vegetation of the southern Cape Provinces of South Africa.

== Description ==
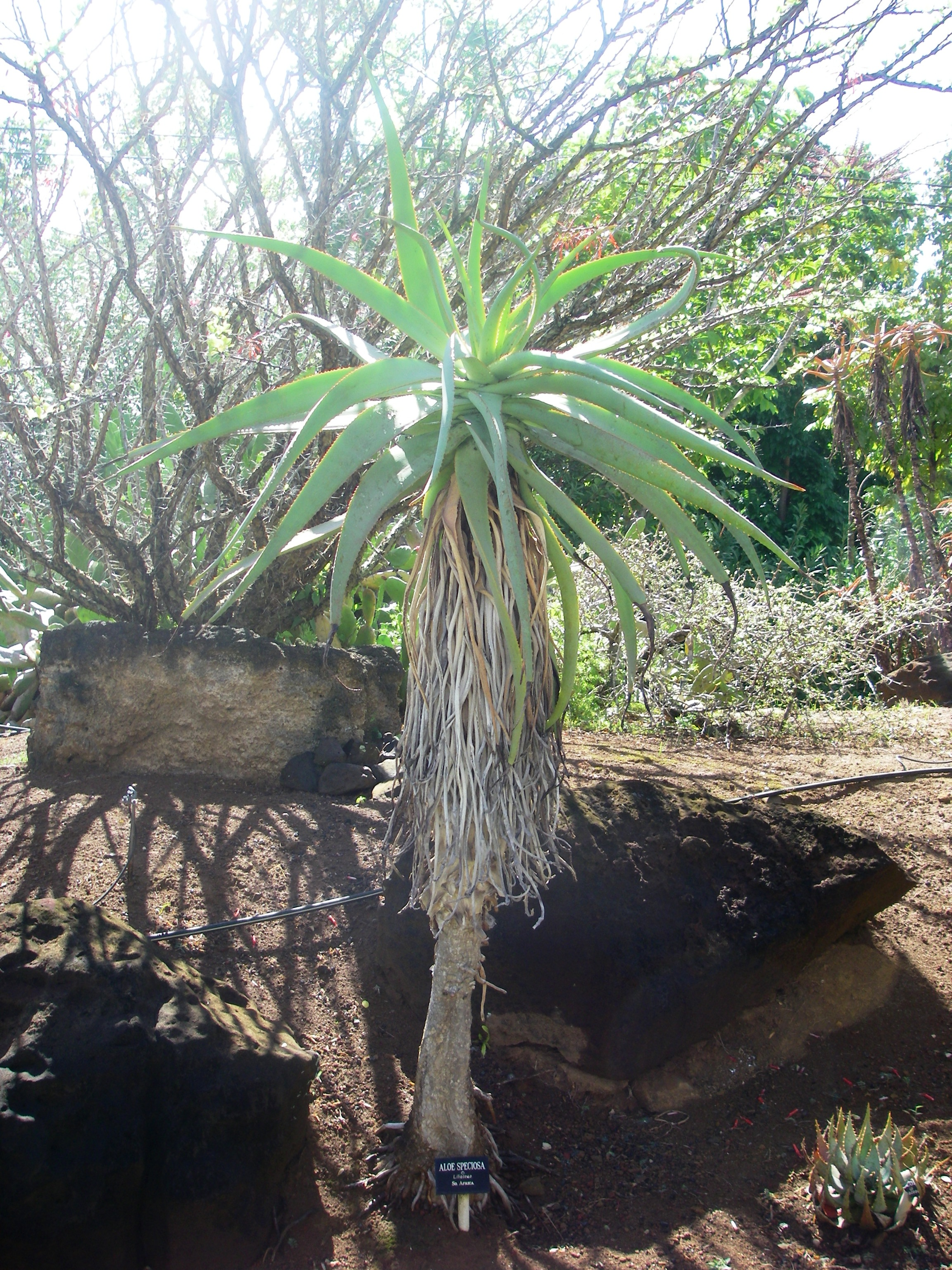
Tilt-head aloe in cultivation

The tilt-head aloe is so named because of the way that its rosette tilts to one side, in the direction of the greatest sun. In its habitat, this is usually to the north (meaning that it acts as a natural compass). It is a tall arborescent aloe species, with long, thin, drooping, pale blue-green leaves, that are densely clustered around its tilted rosette. The pinkish leaf margins are lined with reddish teeth.

Several short, cylindrical, single-branched inflorescences appear in the early spring, when it flowers. The dense flowers are red or green with white stripes. The Latin name "speciosa" means showy, and was actually given in reference to its ornamental flowers. The species is also known as Aloe hexapetala - also in reference to its flowers ("hexa-petala" means "six-petaled").

== Distribution and habitat ==
The tilt-head aloe is found in two disjunct spots. It occurs in the south-central part of the Western Cape province, from near Swellendam to the Little Karoo. It also occurs over a large part of the southern Eastern Cape province as far as the border of the Transkei, South Africa.

Here its habitat is often dense thickets, especially the Albany Thicket biome. It often grows in association with Aloe ferox, A. africana and A. pluridens, and hybrids can occur.
