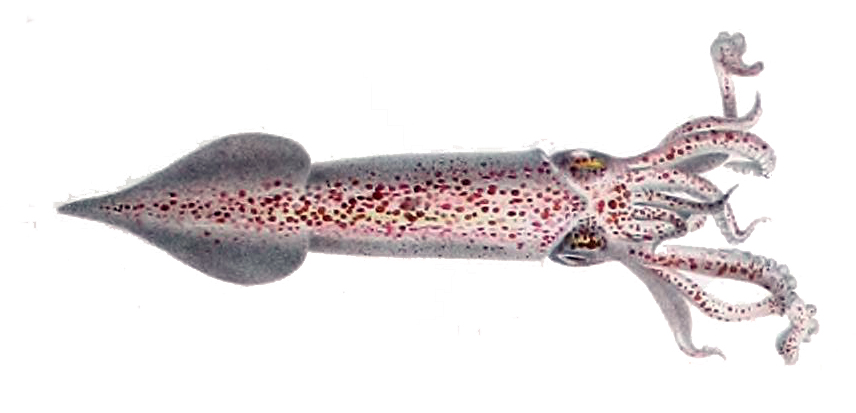

Conservation status
- Data Deficient (IUCN 3.1)

Scientific classification
- Kingdom: Animalia
- Phylum: Mollusca
- Class: Cephalopoda
- Order: Myopsida
- Family: Loliginidae
- Genus: Alloteuthis
- Species: A. media

Binomial name
- Alloteuthis media (Linnaeus, 1758)

Synonyms
- Alloteuthis medius (Linnaeus, 1758); Loligo marmorae Vérany, 1839; Loligo parva Froriep, 1806); Loligo urceolata Risso, 1854; Loligo urceolatus Risso, 1854; Sepia media Linnaeus, 1758

= Alloteuthis media =

Species of squid

Alloteuthis media, the midsize squid or little squid, is a species of squid in the family Loliginidae from the eastern Atlantic and the Mediterranean Sea. It is generally a by-catch species in trawl fisheries, although there is an active fishery in the western Mediterranean.

== Description ==
Alloteuthis media is hard to tell apart from Alloteuthis subulata. The arms and tentacles of A. media are proportionately slender compared to A. subulata but the two species are best separated by the lateral edge of the mantle, which in A. media extends into a short pointed tail of up to 10mm in length in adults. It grows to a total body length of 200 mm long, with a maximum mantle length of 120mm and the females being larger than the males, with the length of the heart-shaped fins, including the tail, is less than a half the length of the mantle. The hear shape of the fins is produced by their convex anterior ends and then their narrowing posterior edges which become part of the pointed tail. The tentacular club is broad and the diameter of the largest of the suckers in the club is 9–14 % of the width of head. The pairs of suckers in the centre of the club are attached at almost right angles to the axis of the club. In males the hectocotylus is on the Left ventral arm which typically has 11 normal suckers in a ventral row (plus or minus 1), with papillae towards the tip. Sexual maturity is reached in females when they attain about 95mm in length and 55mm in males.

== Distribution ==
Alloteuthis media occurs in the eastern North Atlantic Ocean and the Mediterranean Sea, reported as having a southern limit at Cape Blanc, around 20°N, and a northern one at 60°N in the eastern Atlantic. It is rare in the North Sea with records from the Irish Sea and English Channel on the late 19th and early 20th Centuries. More recently it has not been recorded north of the Iberian Peninsula In the Mediterranean Sea it is widespread and its distribution includes the Sea of Marmara.

== Biology ==
Alloteuthis media is found over occurs on sandy and muddy substrates and prefers waters between 0 and 200m in depth in coastal areas and over the continental shelf, although a maximum depth of 500m has been recorded. It undertakes seasonal migrations between offshore and coastal waters, similar to other neritic species of squid. Spawning is continuous in the western Mediterranean but peaks of mature adults can be discerned, the early on in February when large individuals can be found at depths of 150–200m and these begin to move into shallow to spawn over sandy substrates in March and April, spawning occurs to a lesser among beds of Posidonia sea grass. The later spawning group, is made up of smaller individuals than the earlier group and they migrate onshore during June and July and spawn later in the year. Depending on the water temperature the squid return to deeper waters by late autumn. In the northern Tyrrhenian Sea there are also two peaks of spawning activity, the early one in May and the later in September. Sexual maturity is attained at a variety of size ranges, as seen in other Mediterranean cephalopods, with the eastern populations maturing at smaller mantle lengths than the western. In the eastern Mediterranean the smallest mature females have a mantle length of 37mm, the smallest mature males have one of 32mm while in the western part of that sea the smallest mature females have mantle lengths of 80 mm while that of the smallest mature females measures 50 mm. Females in the eastern basin lay more eggs than those in the west and the eggs they lay are larger which suggests that this species has a higher reproductive productivity in the eastern Mediterranean compared to the western. The male's spermatophores vary between 2.3 and 3.4mm in length and each male bears no more than 170 spermatophores. The females lay the eggs several batches and they are held in short, gelatinous capsules, similar to the capsules of Loligo vulgaris, but less robust and transparent rather than opaque. The egg clusters, each containing up to 1400 eggs, are adhered to hard objects on the sea bed such as shells, corals and stones). Alloteuthis media is a predator which uses crustaceans, molluscs and small fishes as prey. Their life cycle is estimated to be around a year for males and eighteen months for females.

== Taxonomy ==
Recent molecular analyses suggest that Alloteuthis media and A. subulata may be conspecific and that they are the extreme ends of a morphological gradient. In which case the name Alloteuthis media applied by Carl Linnaeus in his Systema Naturae in 1758 would have priority over Jean Baptiste Lamarck's A. subulata which dates from 1798. However, further analyses suggest that these are indeed two sister species which can be reliably separated by the size of the central suckers of the tentacular club and that in fact there is a genetic divergence between the Atlantic and the Mediterranean populations of A. media.

== Fisheries ==
Alloteuthis media is normally a bycatch in trawl fisheries for other species but it is marketed throughout most of the Mediterranean with other Alloteuthis species. In the western Mediterranean it is actively fished for in a trawl fishery and in the winter it is captured at depths of 150m to 200m and from between 50m and 150m in spring, summer and autumn. Its seasonal abundance varies widely, but there is little annual variation. Commercial interest in this species varies according to location and the catch is marketed in both fresh and frozen forms.
