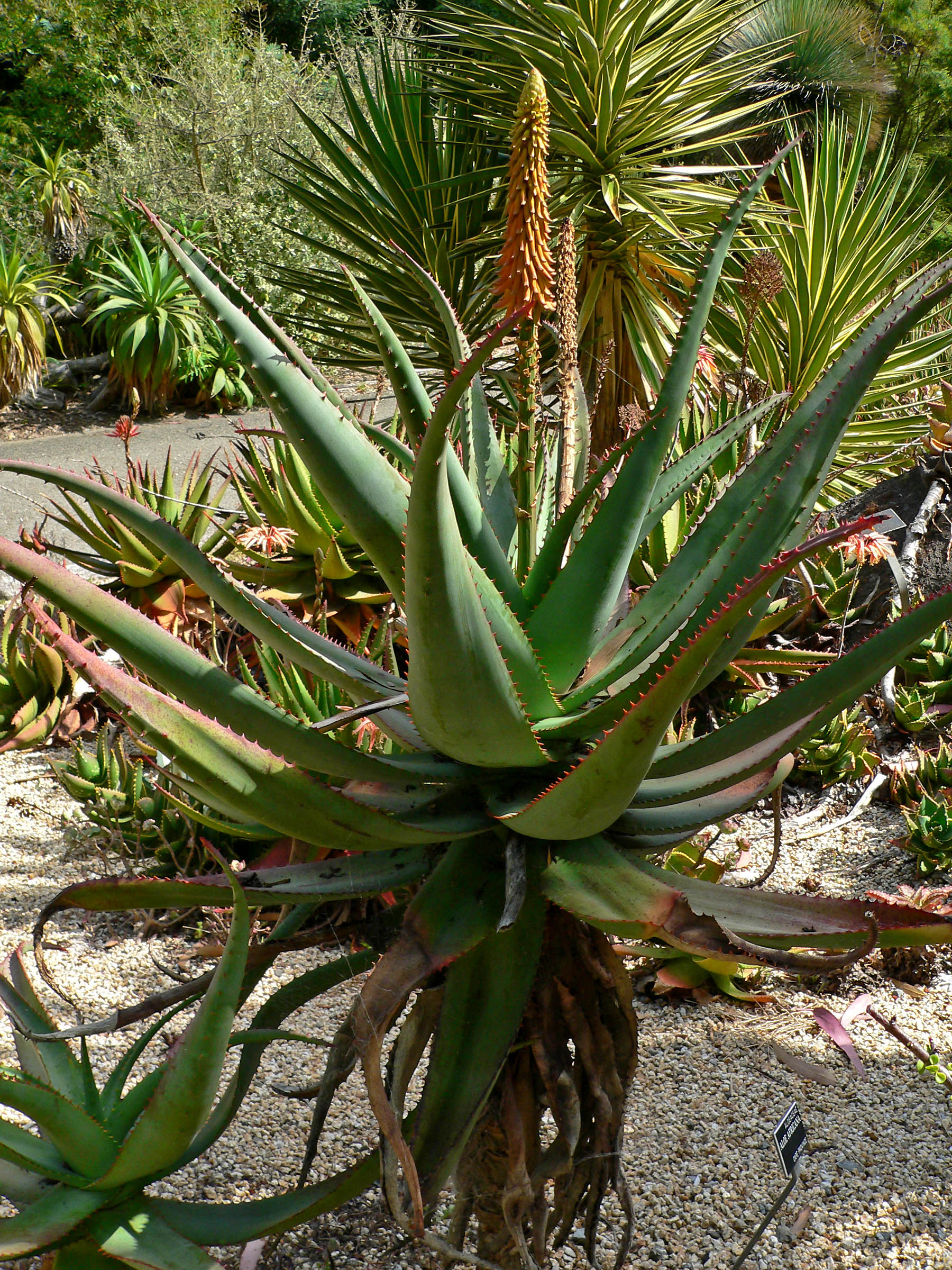

Conservation status
- CITES Appendix II (CITES)

Scientific classification
- Kingdom: Plantae
- Clade: Tracheophytes
- Clade: Angiosperms
- Clade: Monocots
- Order: Asparagales
- Family: Asphodelaceae
- Subfamily: Asphodeloideae
- Genus: Aloe
- Species: A. africana

Binomial name
- Aloe africana Mill.

Synonyms
- Aloe perfoliata var. africana (Mill.) Aiton; Aloe pseudoafricana Salm-Dyck; Aloe africana var. angustior Haw.; Aloe africana var. latifolia Haw.; Aloe angustifolia Haw.; Pachidendron africanum (Mill.) Haw.; Pachidendron angustifolium (Haw.) Haw.; Aloe bolusii Baker

= Aloe africana =

Species of succulent

Aloe africana (known as the Uitenhage aloe) is an arborescent (tree-like) species of aloe plant, indigenous to the Eastern Cape Province, South Africa.

== Description ==
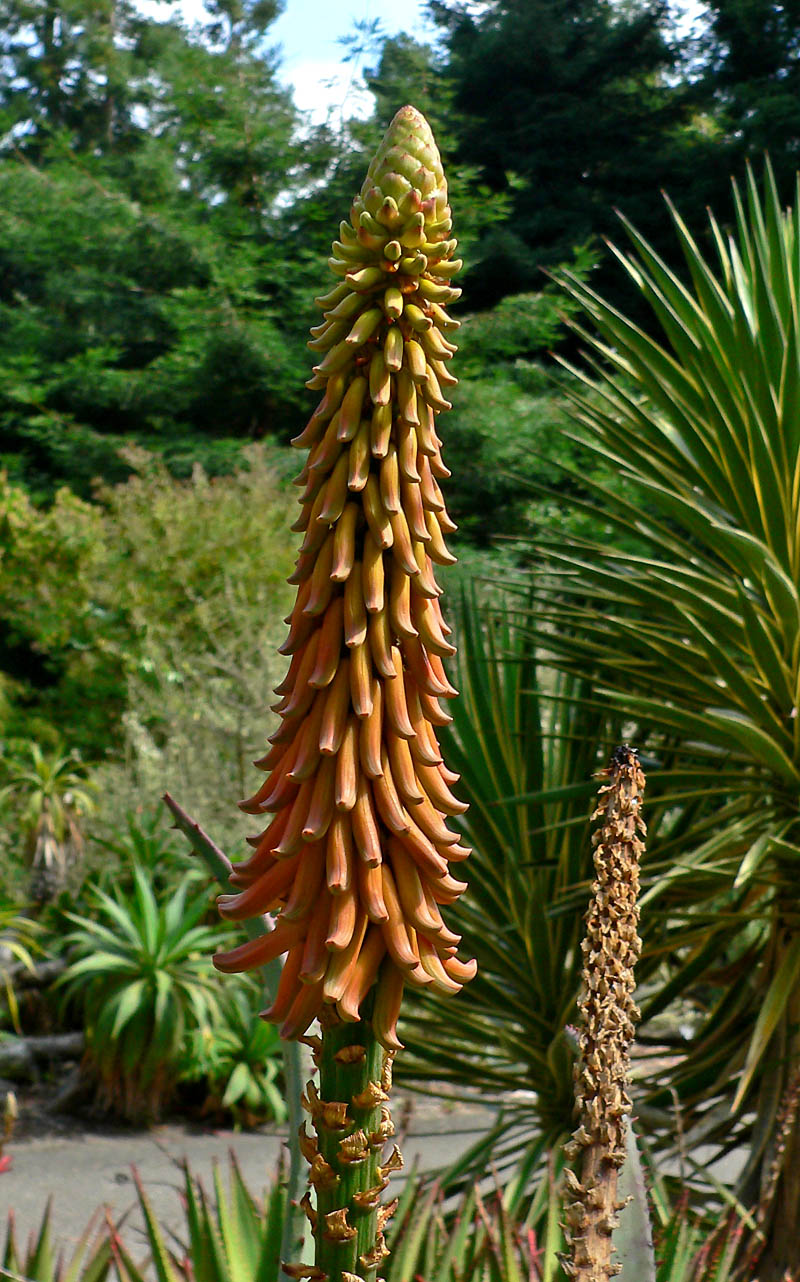
Details of the tall, cylindrical raceme, showing the distinctively up-turned flowers

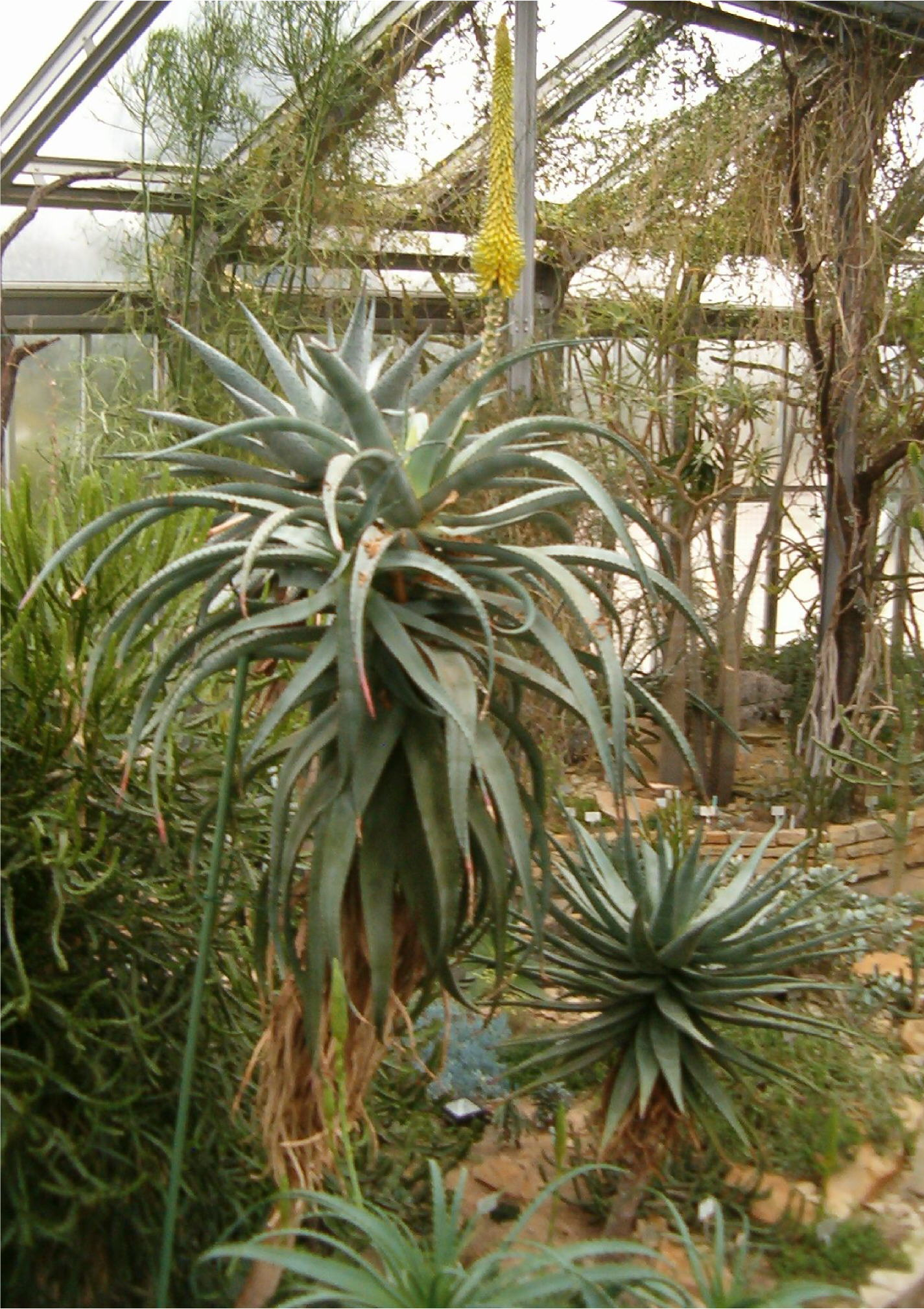
Typically disorderly rosette of slender spreading and recurved leaves

The plant grows slowly and flowers when it is four to five years old. Flowering time is from winter to early spring (July to September in South Africa). Its large raceme is erect and may be unbranched or have up to four branches, and has tubular flowers that are orange or yellow.

Uniquely, the small flowers are each up-turned, with a distinctive bend. As this aloe species can sometimes look very similar to related species (e.g. Aloe excelsa, Aloe lineata or Aloe ferox), this feature is useful for identification.

The thin, narrow leaves are more messy or disorderly than the neat symmetrical rosettes of other arborescent Aloe species. The leaves are also more recurved. They are arranged in a dense apical rosette and are spreading to recurved, firm linear-lanceolate, with a grey-green surface; each leaf's margins and lower side are armed with lines of small, reddish teeth, a feature common in the genus Aloe.

The distinguishing features of this species therefore include: yellow-orange flowers that are bent to almost 90 degrees; racemes that are large, tall and tapering to a point; narrow spreading or recurved leaves, arranged in a relatively untidy rosette.

== Distribution and habitat ==
This attractive species occurs in the Eastern Cape of South Africa, where its distribution is centred on the area around Port Elizabeth and Uitenhage.

It is mainly confined to hills and flats, growing in thicket and renosterveld vegetation. However it is able to adapt to a wide range of conditions. It often grows in association with Aloe ferox, A. pluridens and A. speciosa, and hybrids are not uncommon. The climate is moderate, without frost, and hot and humid during summers. Rainfall occurs throughout the year, from 600 to 700 mm per annum.

== See also ==
- Aloe
- Asphodeloideae
- Succulent plants
