= Ameles africana =

Scientific classification
- Kingdom: Animalia
- Phylum: Arthropoda
- Clade: Pancrustacea
- Class: Insecta
- Order: Mantodea
- Family: Amelidae
- Genus: Ameles
- Species: A. africana

Binomial name
- Ameles africana Bolivar, 1914

Species of praying mantis

Ameles africana is a species of praying mantis that inhabits Algeria, Morocco, Corsica, Dalmatia, Sardinia, Sicily, and Portugal.

== See also ==
- List of mantis genera and species
