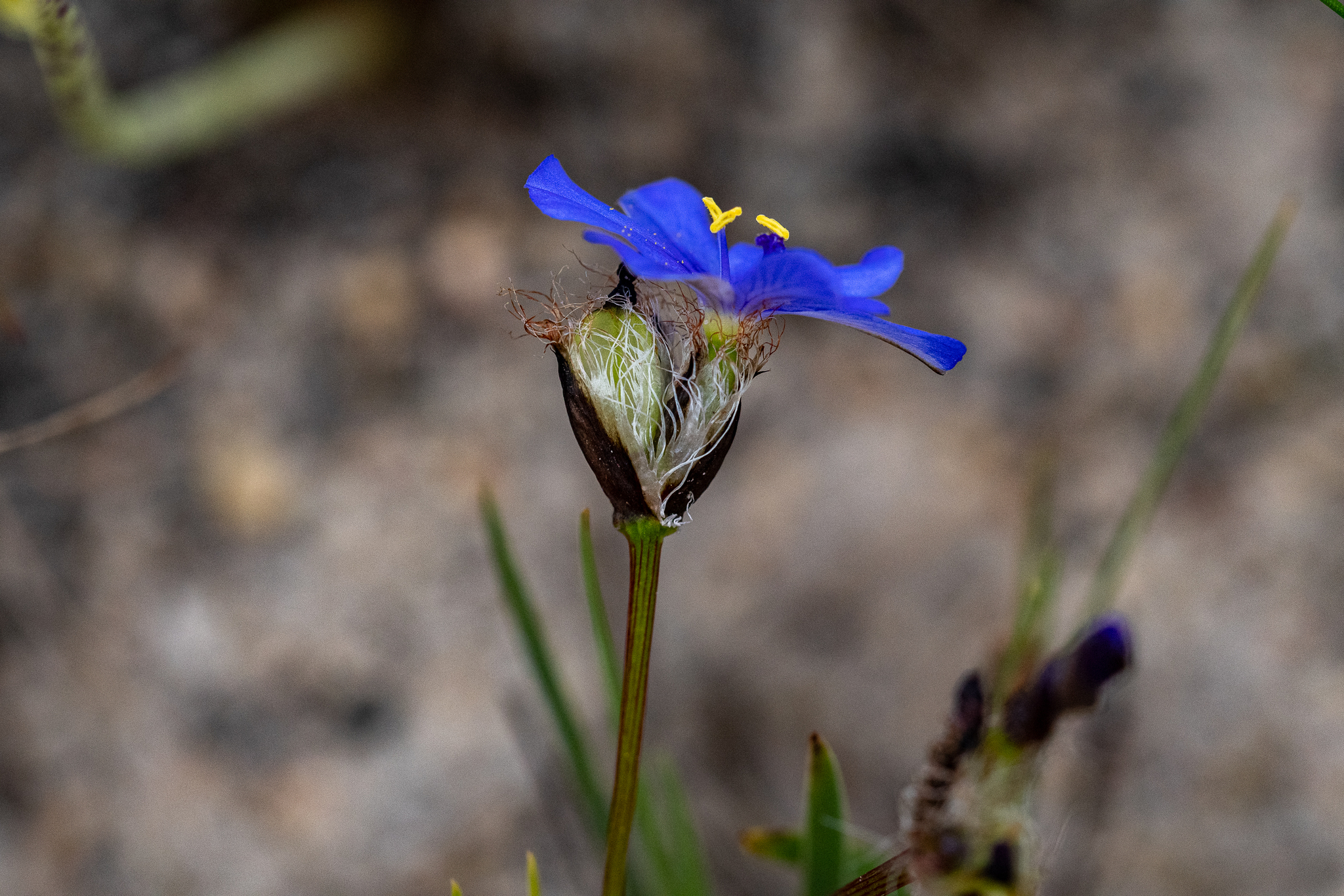

Scientific classification
- Kingdom: Plantae
- Clade: Tracheophytes
- Clade: Angiosperms
- Clade: Monocots
- Order: Asparagales
- Family: Iridaceae
- Genus: Aristea
- Species: A. africana

Binomial name
- Aristea africana (L.) Hoffmanns.

= Aristea africana =

Species of flowering plant

Aristea africana, commonly known as African Capeblue or maagbossie, is a cormous geophyte of 10-15 cm high belonging to the genus Aristea. It has sword-shaped leaves at the base of the stem, blue almost star-symmetrical flowers in small clusters, that are subtended by bracts with silvery, deeply fringed margins. Each individual flower lasts less than a day, wilting and twisting shut by the afternoon. The species is endemic to the Western Cape and occurs in fynbos from the Gifberge to Bredasdorp and Riversdale.

== Description ==
Plants of the African capeblue are usually about 10–15 cm (3.9–5.9 in) tall. The stem is flattened and can be single or have 1 to 3 thin, nearly upright branches. The leaves grow in a bunch at the base, look like small swords, and are as long as or longer than the stem. They are 3–5 mm (0.12–0.20 in) wide and are soft to touch. The upper leaves have edges that are fringed near the bottom. The flowers grow in just a few loose clusters, with 3 to 6 flowers in each cluster. The spathes and bracts at the base of the flowers are 8–12 mm (0.31–0.47 in) long. They are green to brown in the middle, with wide, silvery-translucent edges that are closely and deeply fringed. Sometimes, they are rust-coloured near the tips. The blue flowers have petals that are narrower at the base with a rounded top and 8–12 mm (0.31–0.47 in) long. The blue filaments are around 4 mm (0.16 in) long, and the anthers 2 mm, and carries yellow pollen. The blue style of the flower is 5 to 6 mm long and ends in a wider stigma. The seed pods are about 8 mm long and have three deep, wing-like ridges. The seeds are kidney-shaped and flat, with 2 seeds in each chamber of the pod. The seeds are dark brown, angular and about 1½ x 2½ mm with a dimpled texture. The African capeblue mainly flowers between September and December.

=== Differences with related species ===
The African capeblue can most easily be confused with Aristea recisa, but this species is taller at 20-40 cm, and the spades are brown in the upper third.

== Taxonomy ==
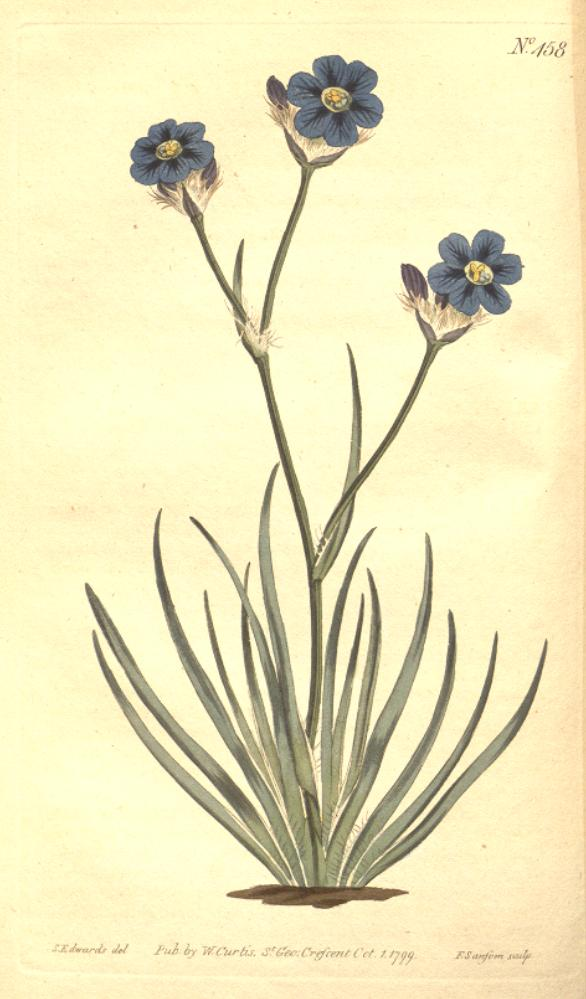
Aristea cyanea, copperplate engraving, hand-coloured with watercolours, by William Curtis, published in The botanical magazine in 1799.

The African capeblue was first scientifically described by the famous Swedish biologist Carl Linnaeus in his magnum opus, the Species Plantarum, the work which is now internationally accepted as the starting point of modern botanical nomenclature, in 1753, and named it Ixia africana. Carl Peter Thunberg, "the father of South African botany", also from Sweden, moved the species in 1787 and made the new combination Moraea africana. In 1789, Scottish botanist William Aiton described Aristea cyanea, the first time this genus name is used. French naturalist Jean-Baptiste Lamarck made the superfluous combination Moraea aristea. In 1824 Johann Centurius Hoffmannsegg assigned the species to the genus erected by Aiton and thus made the currently generally accepted combination Aristea africana. Thunberg suggested the also superfluous combination Aristea eriophora in 1805.

=== Common names ===
The species is called blousuurkanol, maagbos or maagbossie in Afrikaans, and African capeblue in English.

== Distribution, ecology and conservation ==
The African capeblue is an endemic species of the Western Cape province of South Africa, where it can be found from the Gifberge in the North to Bredasdorp and Riversdale in the East. It occurs in fynbos on weathered sandstone, but also on eroded granite, and on clay soils in areas that have high rainfall. It is quick to colonize disturbed areas. The historic habitat of the species is now partly occupied by plantations, other agriculture and urban expansion in the past. The vibrant blue flowers do not produce nectar. Instead, they open early in the morning and close by midday or early afternoon, and are visited by pollen-collecting female bees. The species is widespread and common, has no major threats, and persists, particularly in disturbed areas. It's continued survival is therefore considered to be of least concern.
