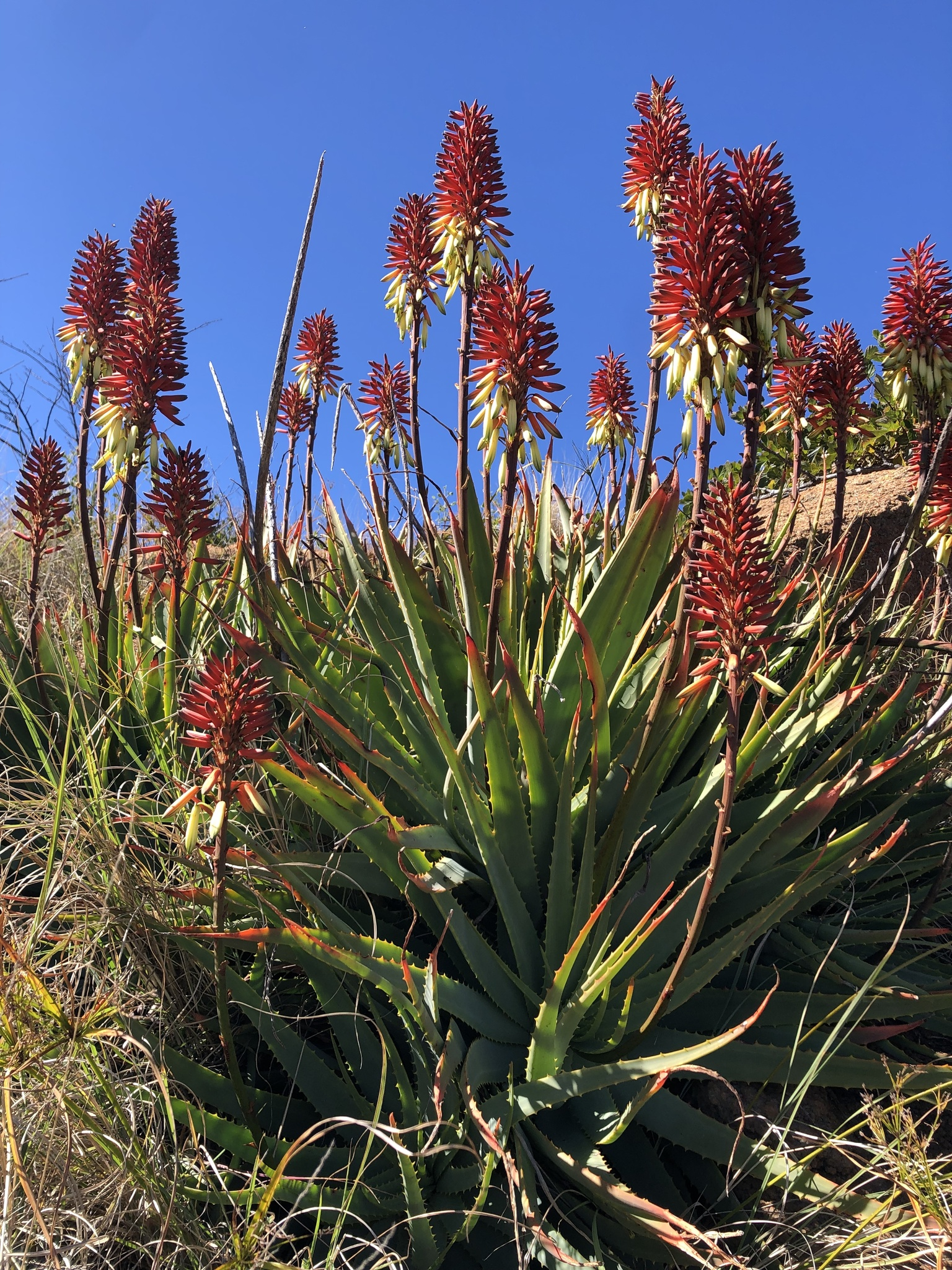

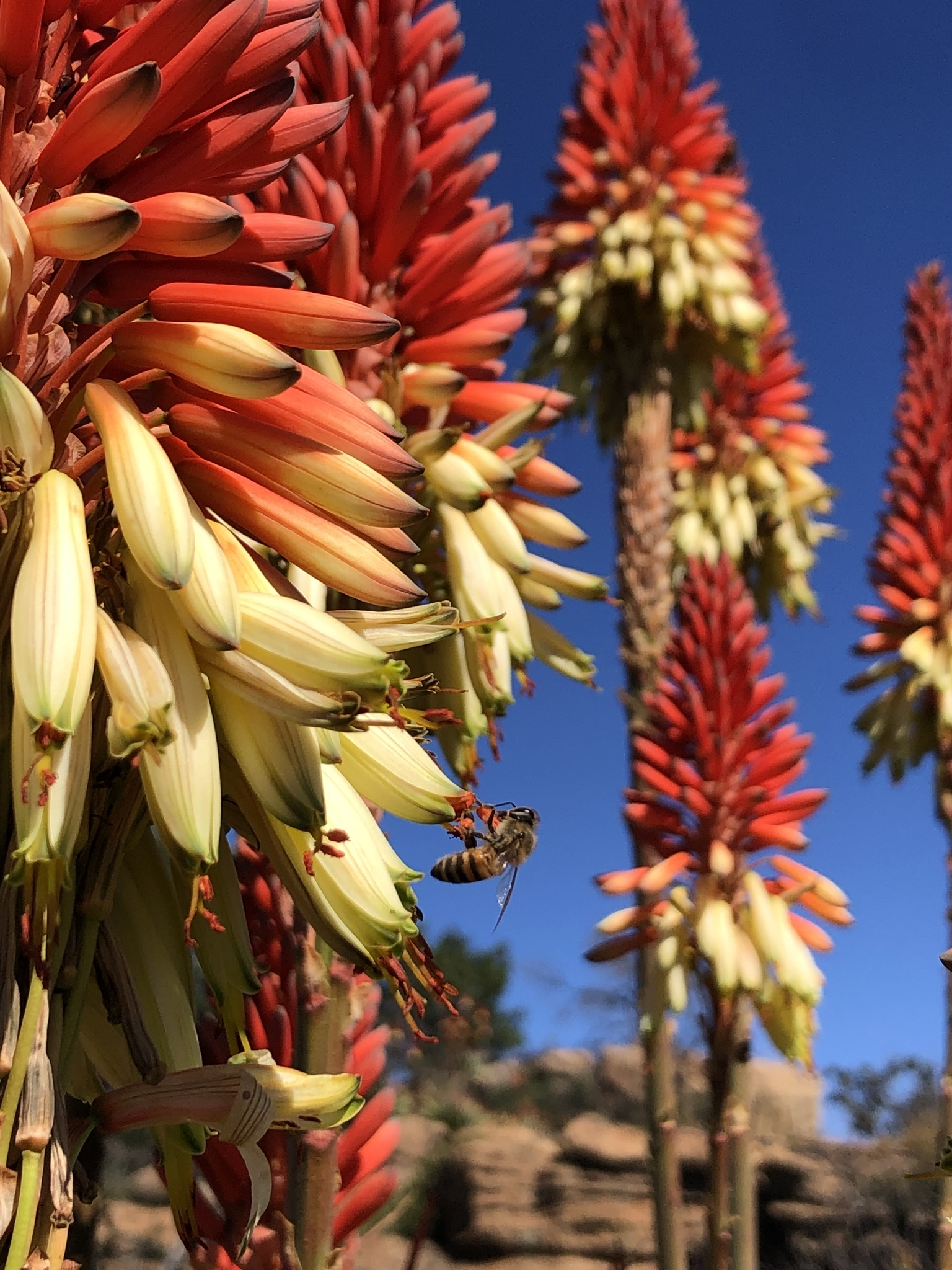

Conservation status
- Least Concern (SANBI Red List)
- CITES Appendix II (CITES)

Scientific classification
- Kingdom: Plantae
- Clade: Tracheophytes
- Clade: Angiosperms
- Clade: Monocots
- Order: Asparagales
- Family: Asphodelaceae
- Subfamily: Asphodeloideae
- Genus: Aloe
- Species: A. mutabilis

Binomial name
- Aloe mutabilis Pillans

= Aloe mutabilis =

Species of aloe endemic to South Africa

Aloe mutabilis, commonly known as the blue krantz aloe is a species of aloe endemic to northern South Africa.

== Range ==
The blue krantz aloe is found from the Strydpoort Mountains near Polokwane in Limpopo down to krantzes surrounding Johannesburg in Gauteng.

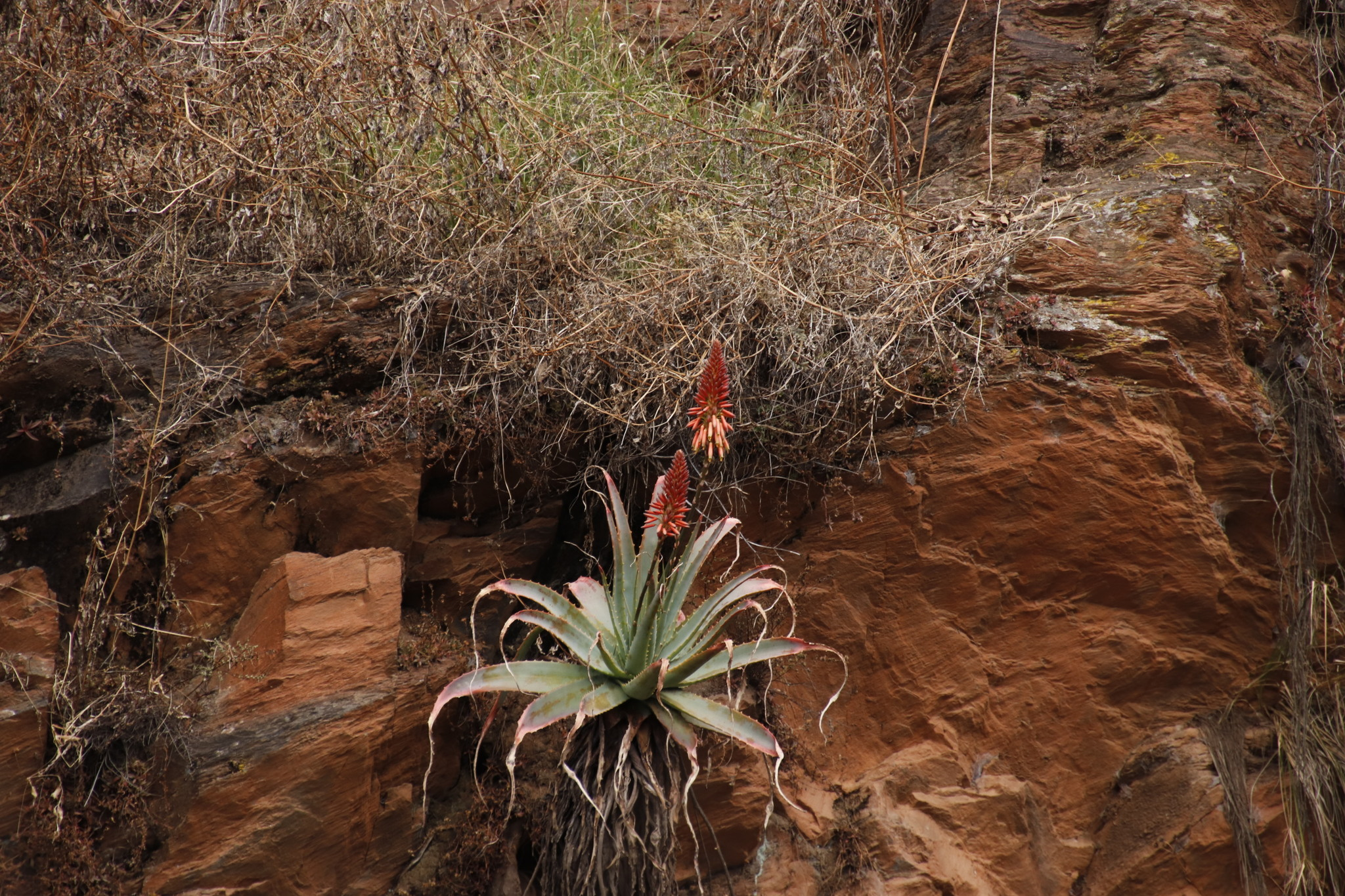
Blue krantz aloe hanging off a cliff face.

== Habitat ==
The blue krantz aloe is often found on steep, rocky cliff faces with its stems hanging down.

== Conservation status ==
As of 2019, it has been assessed as Least Concern by SANBI due to its widespread range and its preferred and isolated habitat of steep cliffs.
