= Alloteuthis africana =

Conservation status
- Data Deficient (IUCN 3.1)

Scientific classification
- Kingdom: Animalia
- Phylum: Mollusca
- Class: Cephalopoda
- Order: Myopsida
- Family: Loliginidae
- Genus: Alloteuthis
- Species: A. africana

Binomial name
- Alloteuthis africana Adam, 1950

Synonyms
- Alloteuthis africanus (Adam, 1950); Loligo africana (Adam, 1950)

Species of squid

Alloteuthis africana, also known as the African squid, is a species of squid in the family Loliginidae. This species of squid is restricted to the Guinean province (from southern Morocco to southern Angola). To identify the Alloteuthis africana from other Alloteuthis congeners, it is highly recommended to measure the width of the squids head and the sucker size.
