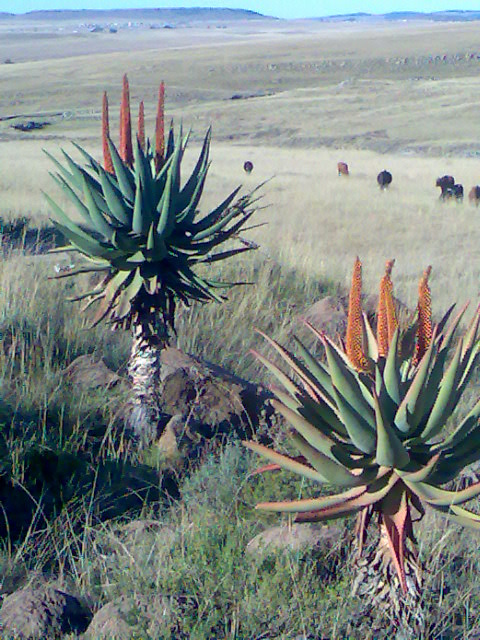
- Aloe ferox on the R61 route between Cofimvaba and Ngcobo.

Conservation status
- CITES Appendix II (CITES)

Scientific classification
- Kingdom: Plantae
- Clade: Tracheophytes
- Clade: Angiosperms
- Clade: Monocots
- Order: Asparagales
- Family: Asphodelaceae
- Subfamily: Asphodeloideae
- Genus: Aloe
- Species: A. ferox

Binomial name
- Aloe ferox Mill.

Synonyms
- Aloe candelabrum A.Berger nom. illeg.; Aloe galpinii Baker; Aloe horrida Haw.; Aloe muricata Haw.; Aloe pallancae Guillaumin nom. inval.; Aloe perfoliata var. ferox (Mill.) Aiton; Aloe pseudoferox Salm-Dyck; Aloe subferox Spreng.; Aloe supralaevis Haw.; Busipho ferox (Mill.) Salisb. nom. inval.; Pachidendron ferox (Mill.) Haw.; Pachidendron pseudoferox (Salm-Dyck) Haw.; Pachidendron supralaeve (Haw.) Haw.

= Aloe ferox =

Species of succulent

Aloe ferox, commonly known as bitter aloe, is a species of flowering plant in the family Asphodelaceae. This woody aloe is indigenous to southern Africa. It is one of several Aloe species used to make bitter aloes, a purgative medication, and also yields a non-bitter gel that can be used in cosmetics.

== Description ==
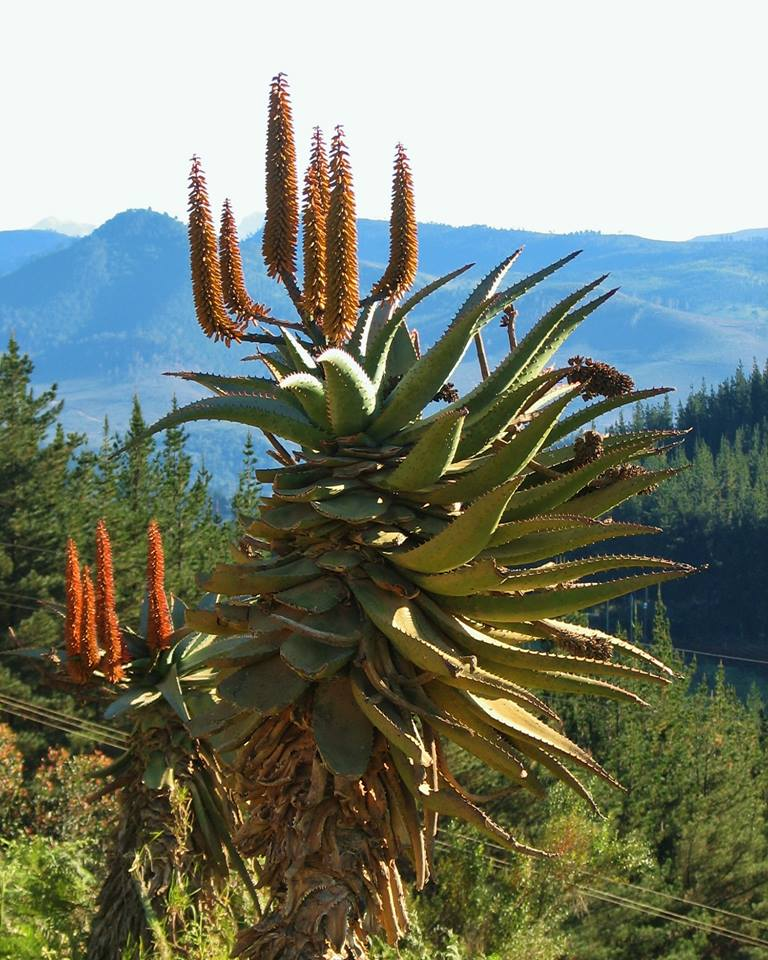
Typical inflorescence of the bitter aloe, with up to eight erect, cylindrical, symmetrical racemes.

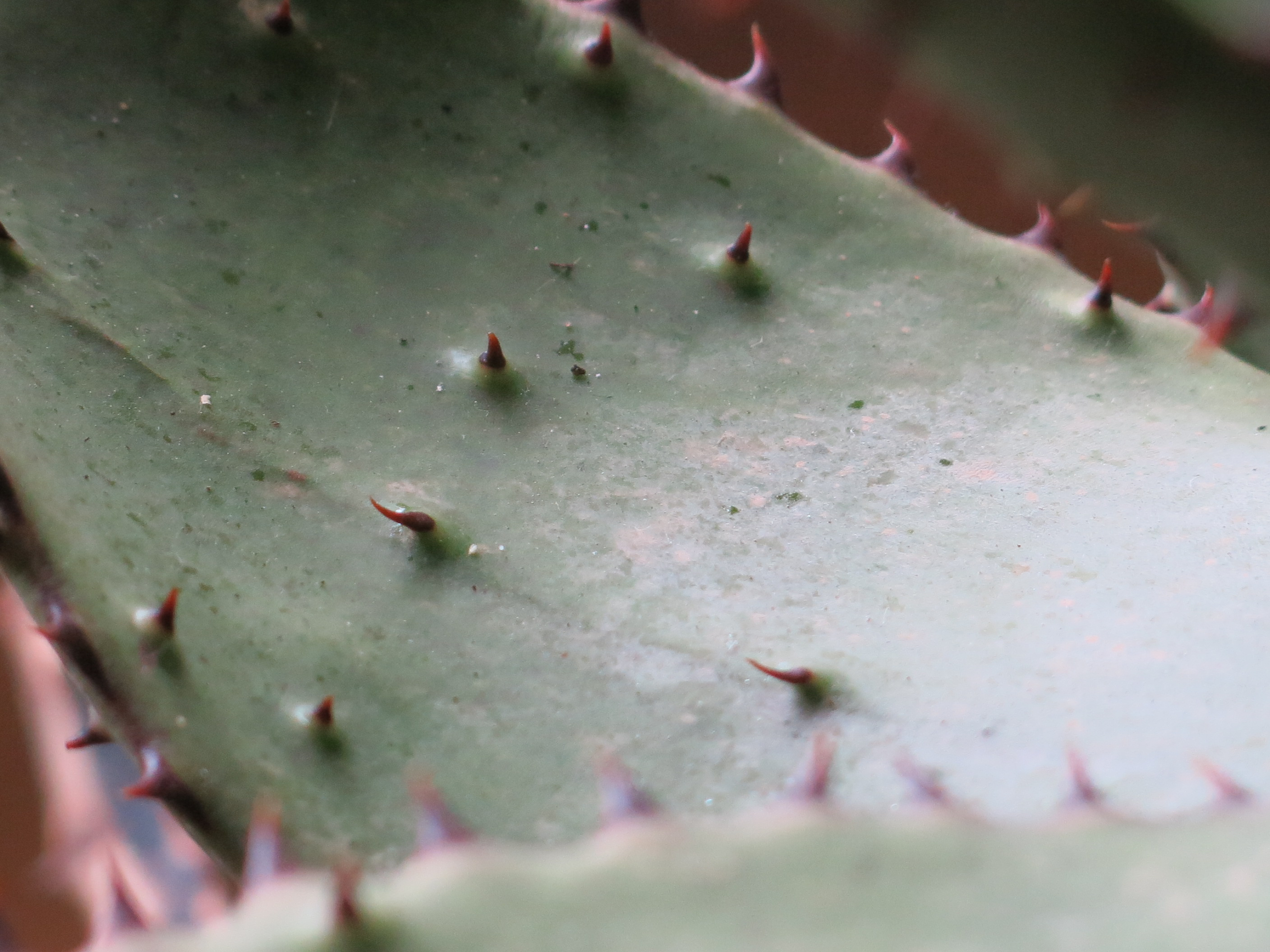
Spines on the inner side of a leaf

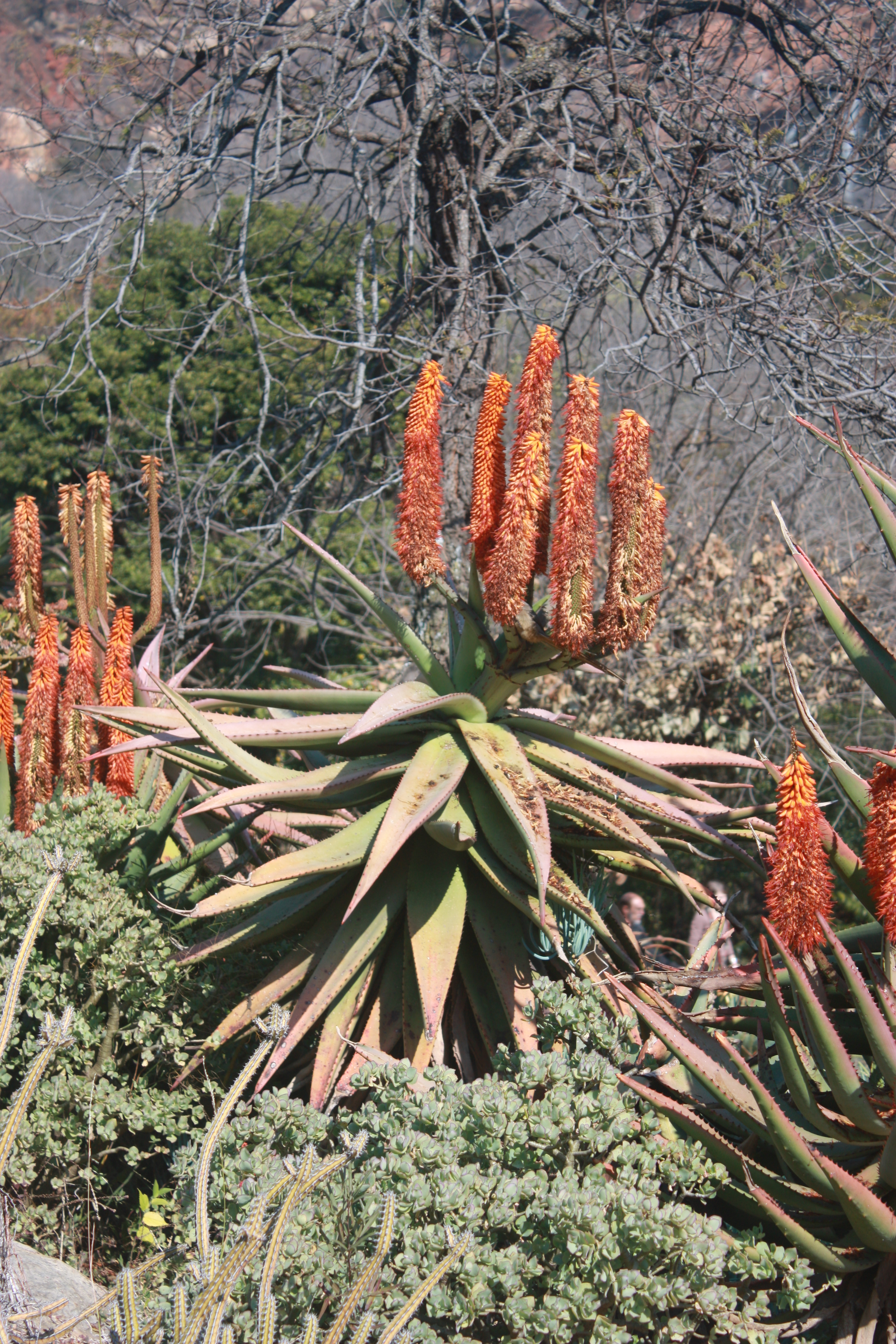
Large bitter aloe in flower.

Aloe ferox is a tall, single-stemmed aloe, that can grow to 10 feet (3.0 m) in height. Its leaves are thick and fleshy, arranged in rosettes, and have reddish-brown spines on the margins with smaller spines on the upper and lower surfaces. The leaf surfaces of young plants are covered in spines; however, as they get taller and less vulnerable to grazing, the leaves begin to lose most of their spines except for those along the leaf margins. Plants in the western part of its natural range tend to keep more of their leaf surface spines.

Its flowers are a uniform orange or red, and stand between 2 and 4 feet (0.61 and 1.22 m) above the leaves, in multi-branched inflorescences.

It is a variable species, and plants may differ physically from area to area, due to local conditions. This aloe is frequently confused with the related Aloe excelsa species, to the north, and they do look very similar when fully grown. However, the flowers are different, with the racemes of Aloe excelsa being far shorter and slightly curved.

Altogether, the bitter aloe can be distinguished from its closest relatives: by its more compact, erect leaves with 6mm reddish-brown teeth on the margins and also on the keel of the leaf near the leaf tip; by their erect candelabra inflorescences, which bear up to eight very dense, cylindrical, symmetrical, 50–80 cm racemes; and by their un-curved, tubular flowers with brown inner segment tips.

== Distribution and habitat ==
Its large natural range forms a near-continuous band across the Northernmost region Limpopo province, southern Cape, from Swellendam and the Overberg District in the west, throughout almost the whole extent of the Eastern Cape Province, eastwards as far as southern KwaZulu-Natal, and northwards into the southern parts of the Free State and Lesotho.

Within this range it can usually be found in rocky areas - on hills, in grassy fynbos and on the edges of the Karoo.

== Cultivation ==
Aloe ferox is known by several names - most commonly as the bitter aloe, but also as the Cape aloe, red aloe and tap aloe.

Aloe ferox plants are propagated mainly from seed and head cuttings, with plants sowed with approximately one meter separations. From seed, it takes about 4 to 5 years for the plants to reach the first harvest. At the time of harvest, each leaf weighs about 1.5 kg to 2 kg. Aloe ferox prefers dry-tropical climates, open areas, sandy-loamy soils, full sun, and moderate watering with a good drainage system.

== See also ==
- Succulent plant
- List of Aloe species
- List of Southern African indigenous trees and woody lianes
