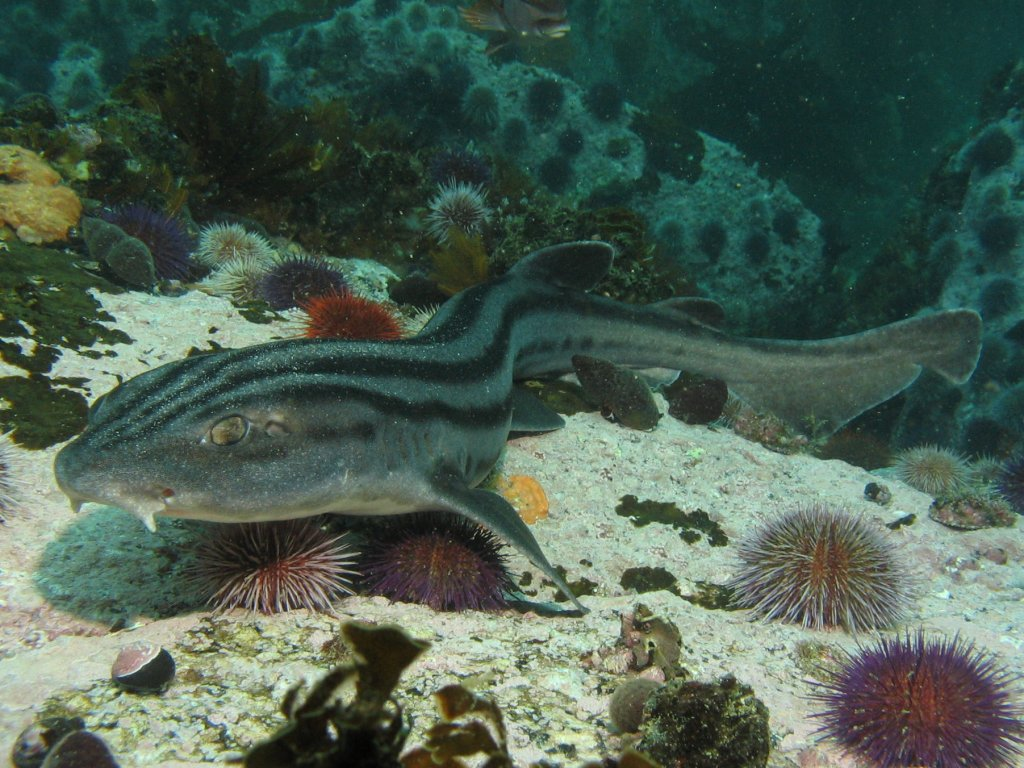

Conservation status
- Least Concern (IUCN 3.1)

Scientific classification
- Kingdom: Animalia
- Phylum: Chordata
- Class: Chondrichthyes
- Subclass: Elasmobranchii
- Division: Selachii
- Order: Carcharhiniformes
- Family: Scyliorhinidae
- Genus: Poroderma
- Species: P. africanum

Binomial name
- Poroderma africanum (J. F. Gmelin, 1789)
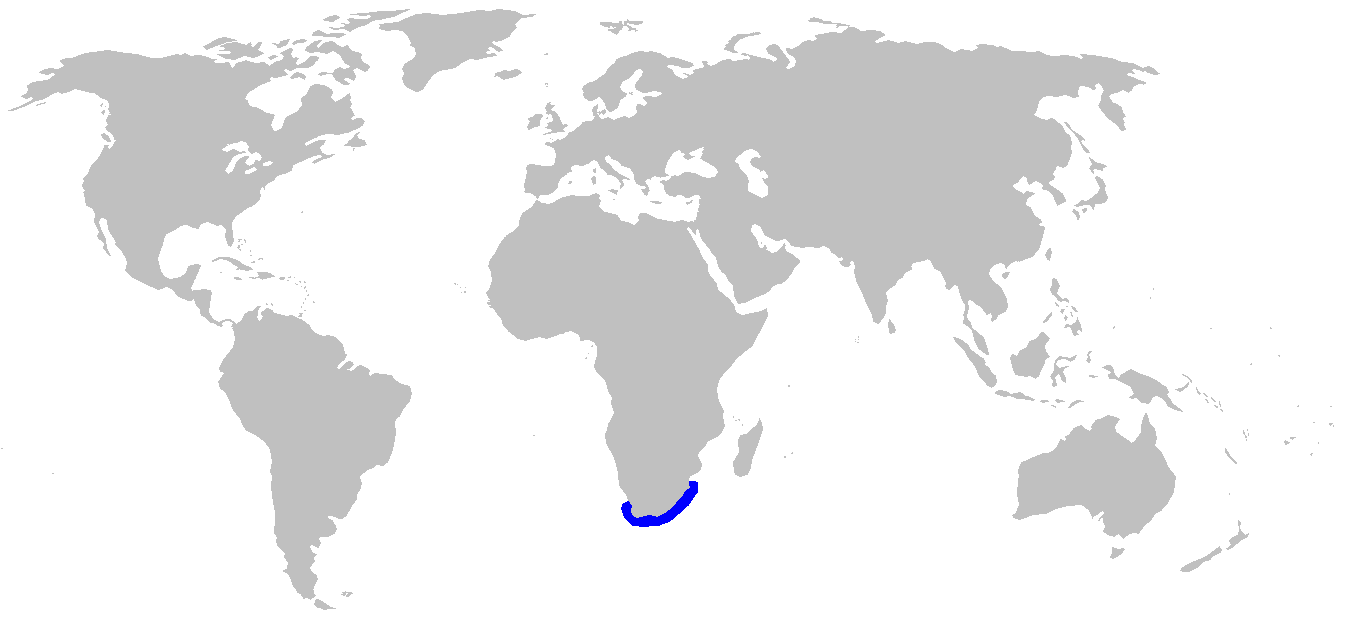
- Range of the pyjama shark

Synonyms
- Squalus africanus Gmelin, 1789; Squalus striatus Forster, 1844; Squalus vittatus Shaw, 1798

= Pyjama shark =

Species of shark

The pyjama shark or striped catshark (Poroderma africanum) is a species of catshark, and part of the family Scyliorhinidae, endemic to the coastal waters of South Africa. This abundant, bottom-dwelling species can be found from the intertidal zone to a depth of around 100 m (330 ft), particularly over rocky reefs and kelp beds. With a series of thick, parallel, dark stripes running along its stout body, the pyjama shark has an unmistakable appearance. It is additionally characterized by a short head and snout with a pair of slender barbels that do not reach the mouth, and two dorsal fins that are placed far back on the body. It can grow up to a length of 1.1 m (3.6 ft) long.

The pyjama shark is primarily nocturnal, spending most of the day lying motionless and hidden in a cave or crevice or among vegetation. It often forms groups, particularly during summer. This species is an opportunistic predator that feeds on a wide variety of fishes and invertebrates; it favors cephalopods and frequents the spawning grounds of the chokka squid (Loligo reynaudi). When threatened, it curls into a circle with its tail covering its head. Reproduction is oviparous, with females laying rectangular, dark brown egg cases two at a time year-round. This small and harmless shark adapts well to captivity and is commonly displayed in public aquariums. It is often caught as a bycatch of commercial and recreational fisheries. Many are killed by fishers who regard them as pests. However, there is no data suggesting its numbers have declined, so the International Union for Conservation of Nature (IUCN) has assessed the pyjama shark as least concern.

== Taxonomy ==
The pyjama shark was originally described as Squalus africanus by German naturalist Johann Friedrich Gmelin in 1789, in the thirteenth edition of Systema Naturae. He did not designate a type specimen. In 1837, Scottish physician and zoologist Andrew Smith created the new genus Poroderma for this species and the related leopard catshark (P. pantherinum, at the time believed to be multiple species). In 1908, the pyjama shark was made the type species of the genus by American zoologist Henry Weed Fowler.

== Distribution and habitat ==
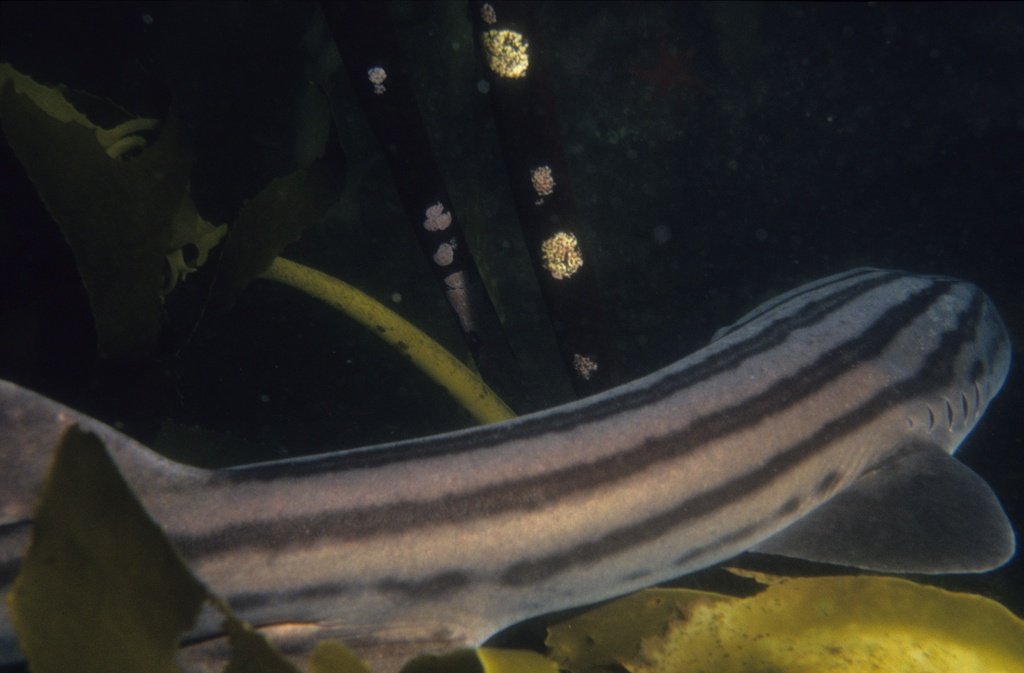
Kelp beds are a preferred habitat of the pyjama shark.

A bottom-dwelling inhabitant of temperate inshore waters, the pyjama shark is found off South Africa, from Table Bay off Cape Town to north of East London. It is most abundant off the Western Cape, and may venture as far as Saldanha Bay in the west and KwaZulu-Natal in the east; old records from Mauritius, Madagascar, and Zaire are almost certainly erroneous. The pyjama shark is commonly encountered in very shallow intertidal and littoral waters no more than 5 m (16 ft) deep, though in and around Algoa Bay it occurs at depths of 50–100 m (160–330 ft) and has been reported to 108 m (354 ft). It favors rocky reefs and beds of Ecklonia kelp.

== Description ==
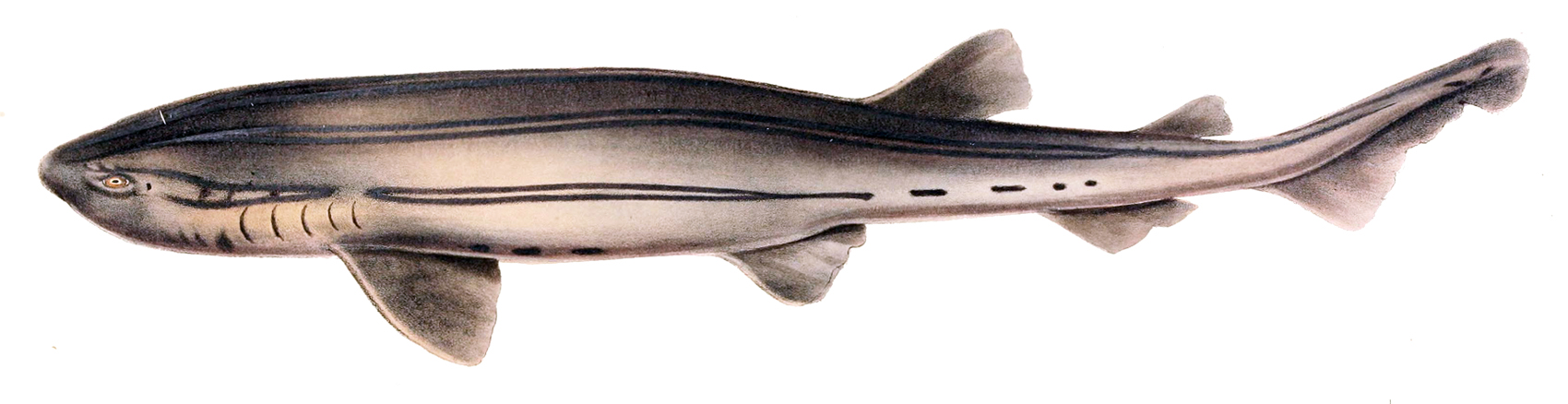
Profile view of a pyjama shark, from Illustrations of the Zoology of South Africa (1838).

The pyjama shark is the larger and thicker-bodied of the two Poroderma species, growing to 1.1 m (3.6 ft) long and 7.9 kg (17 lb) or more in weight. Both sexes grow to roughly the same maximum size. The head and snout are short and slightly flattened, with a narrowly parabolic outline when viewed from above or below. Each nostril is split into tiny incurrent and excurrent openings by a flap of skin in front; the flap has a three-lobed shape with the central lobe forming a long, conical barbel. The barbels are thicker than in the leopard catshark, and do not reach the mouth. The eyes are horizontally oval and placed rather high on the head, with rudimentary nictitating membranes (protective third eyelids) and a thick ridge running underneath. The sizable mouth forms a broad arch, with short furrows extending from the corners onto both the upper and lower jaws; the upper teeth are exposed when the mouth is closed. There are 18–25 and 14–24 tooth rows on either side of the upper and lower jaws, respectively. The teeth have a slender central cusp flanked by a pair of small cusplets; those of adult males are slightly thicker than those of females.

The body is fairly compressed from side to side and tapers towards the tail. The two dorsal fins are placed far back: the first originates over the rear of the pelvic fins while the second originates over the midpoint of the anal fin. The first dorsal is much larger than the second. The pectoral fins are large and broad. The pelvic fins are lower than the pectorals but their bases are about equal in length. Adult males have a pair of short, thick claspers, with the inner margins of the pelvic fins partially fused over them to form an "apron". The short and broad caudal fin has an indistinct lower lobe and a ventral notch near the tip of the upper lobe. The skin is very thick and bears well-calcified dermal denticles; each denticle has an arrowhead-shaped crown with three posterior points, mounted on a short stalk. The dorsal coloration is distinctive, consisting of 5–7 thick, parallel, dark stripes running from the snout to the caudal peduncle on a variably grayish or brownish background; the stripes become broken near the tail and the belly. In some sharks, the main stripe on either side may fork behind the eye, the stripes may be split in two by lighter central lines, or one or more large dark spots may be present. The underside is pale, sometimes with light gray spotting, and clearly demarcated from the flank color. Young sharks resemble the adults, but may be much lighter or have much darker stripes. An albino specimen has been recorded from False Bay.

== Biology and ecology ==
Rather slow-swimming, the pyjama shark spends most of the day resting in caves or crevices or amongst kelp, emerging at night to actively forage for food. Many individuals may congregate at a single spot, particularly in summer. This species falls prey to larger sharks, and is one of the cartilaginous fish most frequently consumed by the broadnose sevengill shark (Notorynchus cepedianus). When threatened, it often curls into a circle with its tail covering its head, in a similar fashion to the shysharks (Haploblepharus). Its eggs are fed upon by the whelks Burnupena papyracea and B. lagenaria, which can pierce the outer covering to extract the yolk within. Like other sharks, the pyjama shark maintains osmotic balance with the environment by regulating its internal concentration of urea and other nitrogenous wastes. Experiments have shown that the shark's capacity for osmoregulation is dependent on how well it has fed.

The pyjama shark feeds on a wide variety of small animals, including bony fishes such as anchovies, gurnards, and hakes, hagfishes, smaller sharks and rays and their egg cases, crustaceans, cephalopods, bivalves, and polychaete worms; it has also been known to scavenge on fish offal. Although it has a predilection for cephalopods, the dietary composition of this opportunistic predator generally reflects the locally available prey types. For example, in False Bay the Cape rock lobster (Jasus lalandii) is the most important food source, followed by cephalopods and then fish. Pyjama sharks have been observed seizing and tearing off tentacles from octopus and cuttlefish with a twisting motion; on one occasion three sharks were seen attacking an octopus simultaneously in this manner. During mass spawnings of the chokka squid (Loligo vulgaris reynaudi), which occur unpredictably year-round but peak from October to December, pyjama sharks deviate from their nocturnal habits and gather in substantial numbers inside the squids' "egg beds" during daytime. The sharks conceal their heads amongst the egg masses, while their stripes break up the outlines of their bodies. As the female squid descend to the sea floor to attach their eggs, guarded by the males, they become vulnerable to the sharks' ambush attacks.

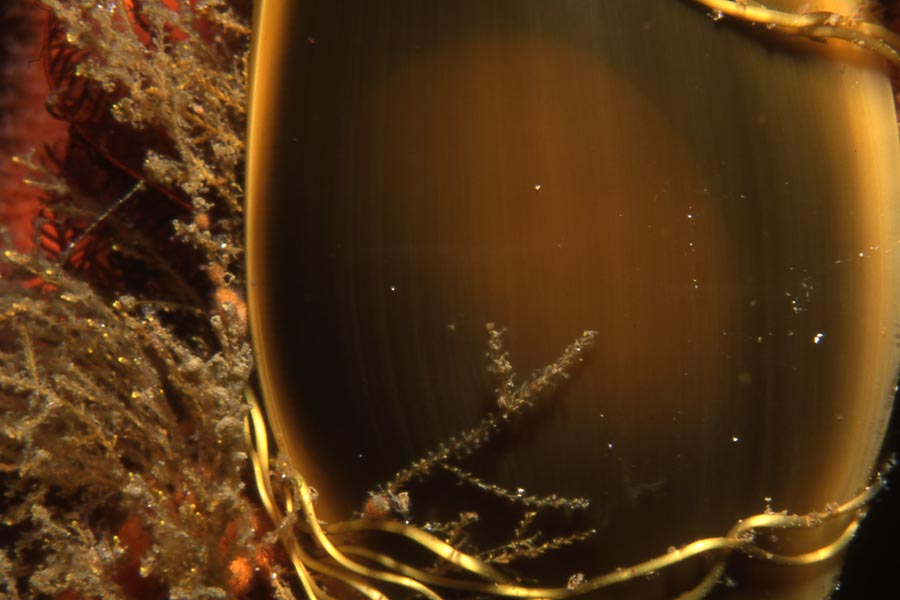
Female pyjama sharks lay dark brown egg capsules, which are attached to structures on the sea floor.

An oviparous species, both male and female pyjama sharks seem to be reproductively active throughout the year. Adult females have a single functional ovary and two functional oviducts, with a single egg maturing in each at a time. The egg is contained in a tough, rectangular, dark brown capsule 9.5 cm (3.7 in) long and 4.5 cm (1.8 in) across, with long tendrils at the corners that enable the female to fasten the capsule to underwater structures such as algae stipes or gorgonians. Eggs maintained in aquariums hatch in approximately five and a half months, with the hatching shark measuring 14–15 cm (5.5–5.9 in) long. Males and females begin to mature sexually at 78–81 cm (31–32 in) and 79–83 cm (31–33 in) long respectively, and all sharks are adult by a length of 89 cm (35 in).

== Human interactions ==
Among the most common South African catsharks, the pyjama shark is harmless to humans and difficult to approach underwater. Because of its small size, attractive appearance, and hardiness, it is popularly exhibited by public aquariums. The aquarium trade supports a small fishery targeting this species and the similar leopard catshark. Large numbers of pyjama sharks are caught incidentally by commercial fisheries using longlines, gillnets, beach-seines, and bottom trawls; they are also readily hooked by recreational anglers, especially during the summer when they aggregate. Although edible, most are discarded while some are used for lobster bait. The toll taken by fishery bycatch is likely greatly underestimated, as many fishers who use line gear regard pyjama sharks as pests that "steal" bait, and kill them before discarding them.

The International Union for Conservation of Nature (IUCN) has listed the pyjama shark as least concern. Despite its limited distribution and a recent increase in fishing pressure on small sharks in the region, there is no evidence to suggest that its population has declined. There are no specific conservation measures in place for this species, though its range encompasses two marine reserves. The South African Sea Fisheries Research Institute is considering legally decommercializing the pyjama shark, which would limit the degree to which it can be targeted by commercial fisheries.
