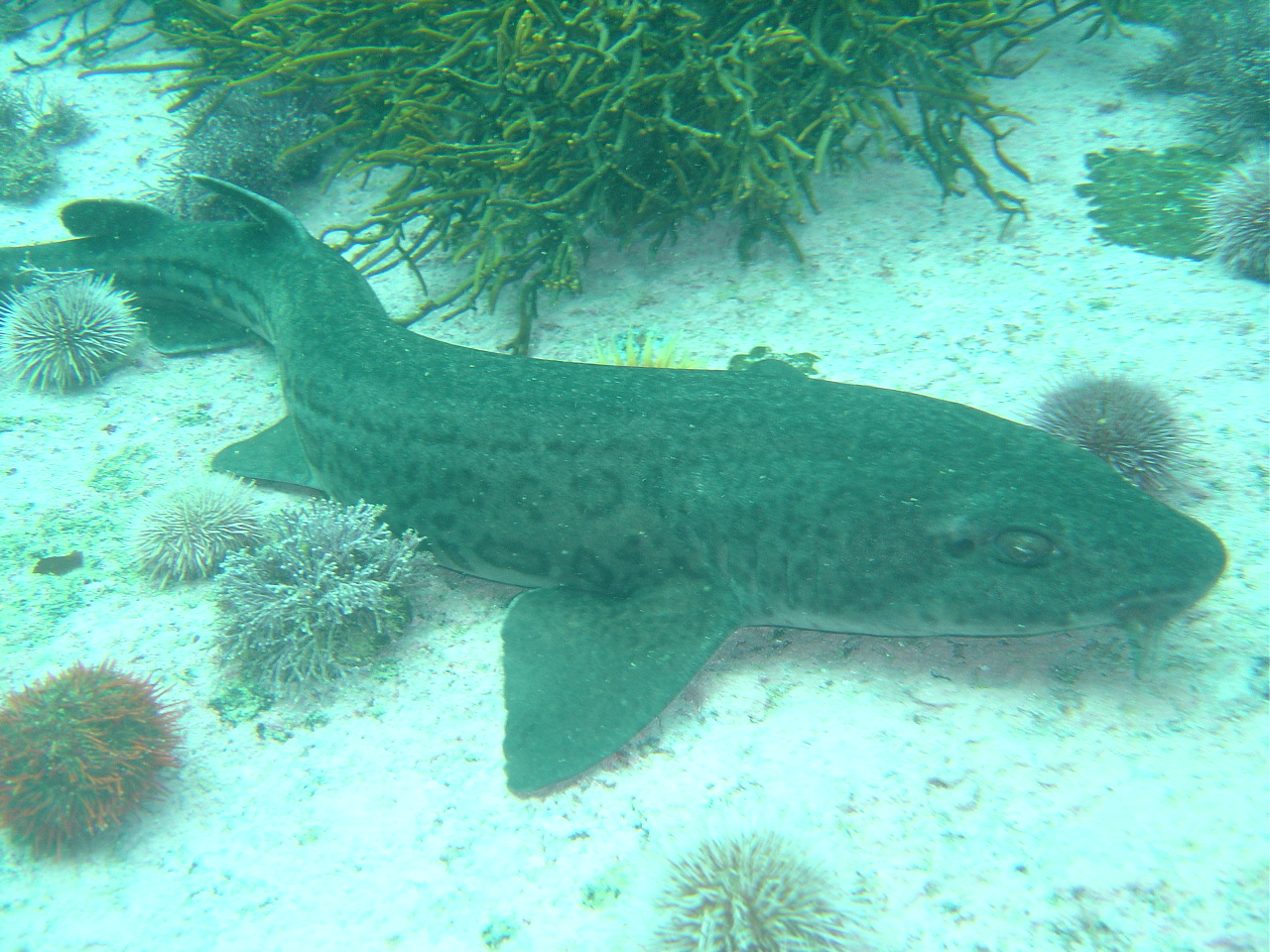
- Leopard catshark photographed at a reef at False Bay in Cape Town, South Africa

Conservation status
- Least Concern (IUCN 3.1)

Scientific classification
- Kingdom: Animalia
- Phylum: Chordata
- Class: Chondrichthyes
- Subclass: Elasmobranchii
- Division: Selachii
- Order: Carcharhiniformes
- Family: Scyliorhinidae
- Genus: Poroderma
- Species: P. pantherinum

Binomial name
- Poroderma pantherinum (J. P. Müller & Henle, 1838)
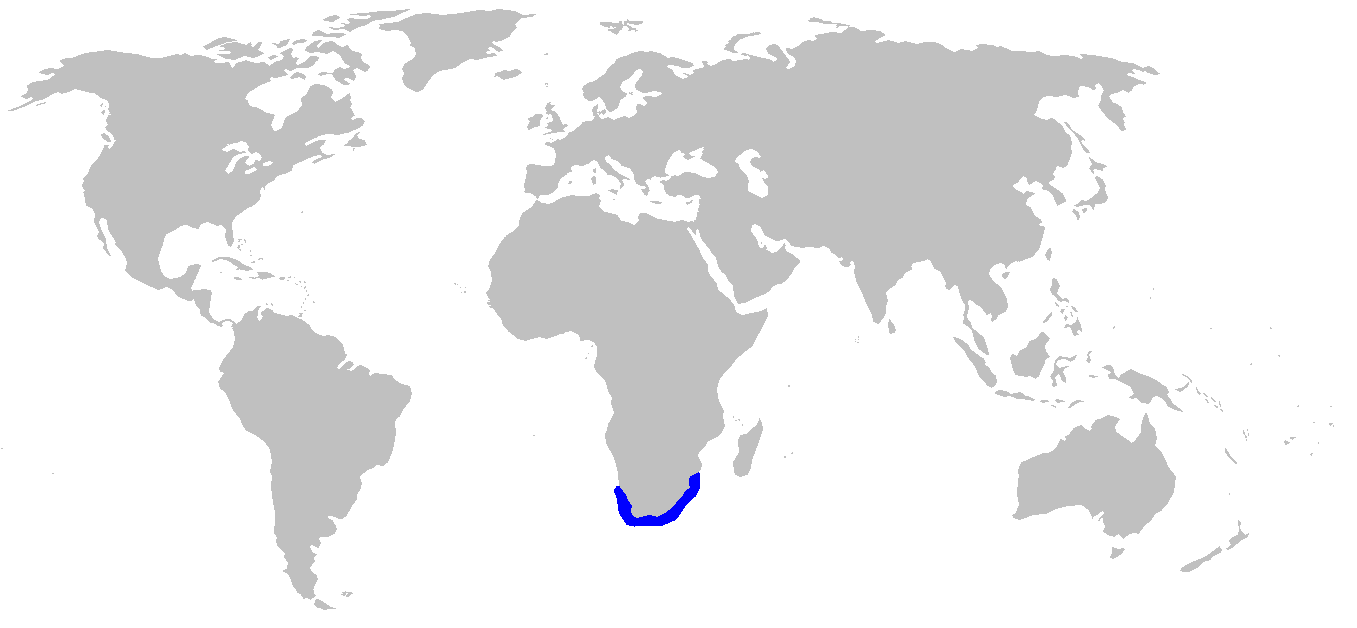
- Range of the leopard catshark

Synonyms
- Poroderma marleyi Fowler, 1934; Poroderma submaculatum A. Smith, 1838; Scyllium leopardinum* J. P. Müller & Henle, 1838; Scyllium maeandrinum J. P. Müller & Henle, 1838; Scyllium pantherinum J. P. Müller & Henle, 1838; Scyllium variegatum J. P. Müller & Henle, 1838 * ambiguous synonym

= Leopard catshark =

Species of shark

The leopard catshark (Poroderma pantherinum) is a species of catshark, and part of the family Scyliorhinidae, endemic to the coastal waters of South Africa. Abundant in inshore waters under 20 m (66 ft) deep, this bottom-dweller favors rocky reefs, kelp beds, and sandy flats. Growing to a length of 84 cm (33 in), the leopard catshark has a stout body with two dorsal fins placed well back, and a short head and tail. It is extremely variable in color and pattern, with individuals ranging from almost white to black and covered by diverse patterns of black spots, blotches, rosettes, and/or lines. The color pattern changes with age and some forms seem to be location-specific, suggesting the presence of multiple distinct, local populations. In the past, some of the more distinct color forms have been described as different species.

Mainly nocturnal in habits, after dusk the leopard catshark hunts for small, benthic bony fishes and invertebrates in shallow water. In daytime, it generally rests inside caves and crevices, sometimes in groups. This species has been documented ambushing spawning chokka squid (Loligo vulgaris reynaudi) within their spawning grounds. Reproduction is oviparous and proceeds year-round. Females produce rectangular, light-colored egg capsules two at a time, attaching them to structures on the sea floor. Small and harmless, the leopard catshark adapts well to captivity and is often exhibited in public aquariums. It is caught by commercial and recreational fishers as bycatch, and often killed as a pest. The International Union for Conservation of Nature (IUCN) has listed this species as least concern; its numbers do not seem to be declining, but heavy human activity occurs within its native waters. The possibly fragmented nature of its distribution also merits caution for each local population.

== Taxonomy ==
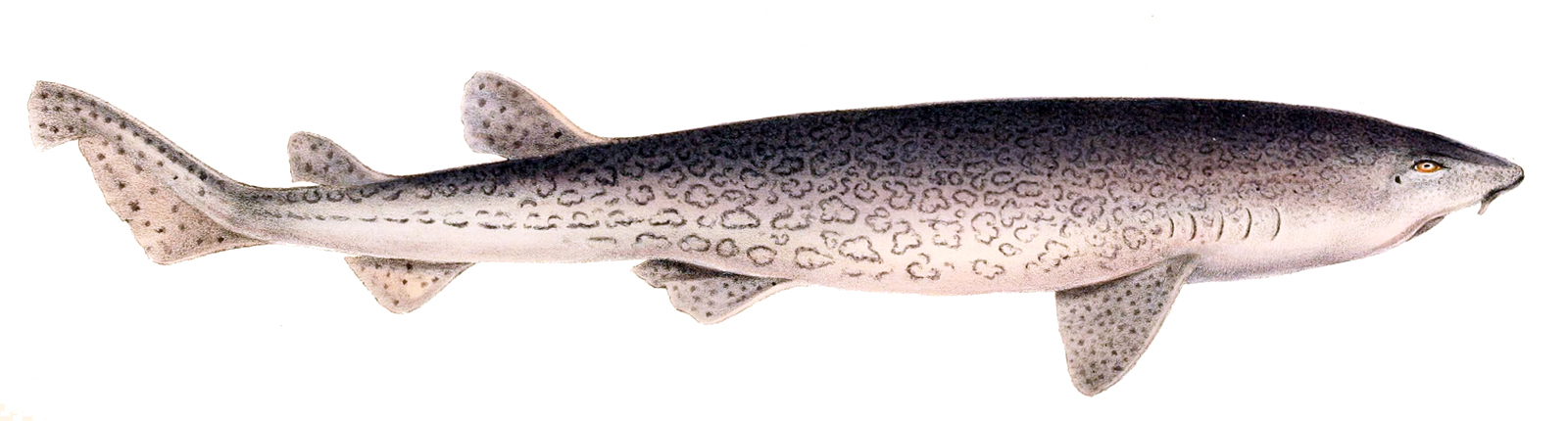
Profile view of a leopard catshark, from Illustrations of the Zoology of South Africa (1838).

Because of its highly variable color pattern, the leopard catshark has historically been known under a multitude of names. In an 1837 issue of Proceedings of the Zoological Society of London, Scottish physician and zoologist Andrew Smith listed without descriptions the new genus Poroderma, containing the species P. africanum (the pyjama shark), P. pantherinum, P. submaculatum, and P. variegatum. German biologists Johannes Peter Müller and Friedrich Gustav Jakob Henle assigned these sharks to the genus Scyllium, and in their 1838–1841 Systematische Beschreibung der Plagiostomen furnished descriptions for S. pantherinum and S. variegatum, and listed two more names without description, S. leopardinum and S. maeandrinum. In 1934, American zoologist Henry Weed Fowler described P. marleyi, characterized by large black spots.

Subsequent authors have recognized these names as based on pattern variants of the leopard catshark; resolving the identity of P. marleyi proved especially problematic and it was not confirmed to be a synonym of this species until 2003. The valid scientific name of the leopard catshark is considered to be Poroderma pantherinum, attributed to Müller and Henle as they were responsible for the description. The specific epithet pantherinum refers to the panther-like patterning of the type specimen, a 65 cm (26 in) long female collected off the Cape of Good Hope. Other common names for this shark include barbeled catshark and blackspotted catshark.

== Distribution and habitat ==
The leopard catshark inhabits the temperate and subtropical inshore waters off South Africa, from Saldanha Bay in the west to the mouth of the Tugela River in the east. There are old and almost certainly erroneous records from Mauritius and Madagascar. Given the color pattern diversity within the species, its range is likely fragmented into a number of small local populations along the South African coast. Bottom-dwelling in nature, the leopard catshark is most commonly encountered from the intertidal zone to a depth of 20 m (66 ft), though it has been reported from as deep as 256 m (840 ft) on the uppermost portion of the continental slope. This species favors rocky reefs, kelp forests, and sandy flats off beaches.

== Description ==
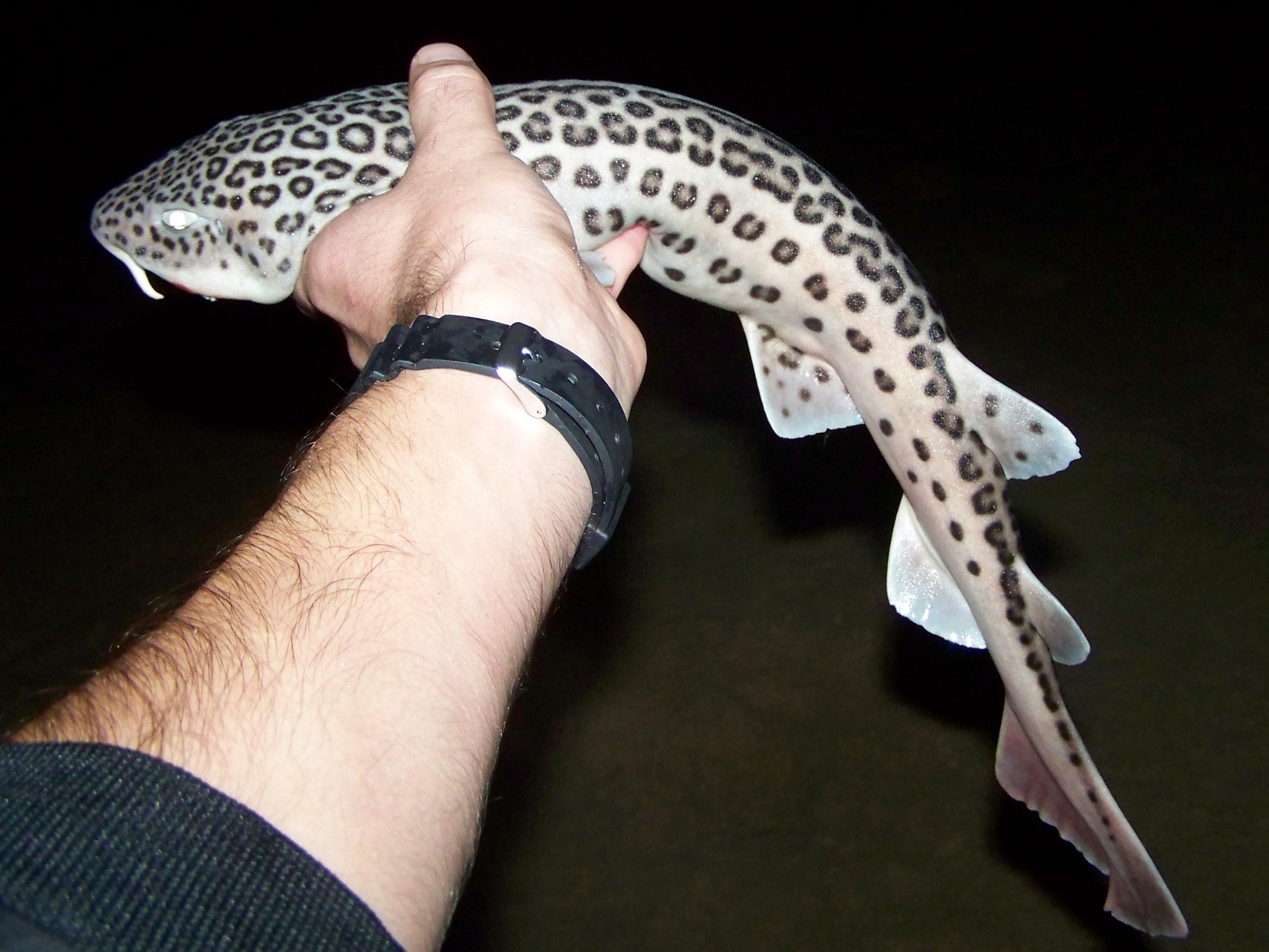
A leopard catshark, showing a spotted pattern; the color patterns of this species are notably diverse.

The leopard catshark is the smaller and slimmer of the two Poroderma species. The head and snout are short and slightly flattened, with a somewhat pointed snout tip. Each nostril is split into tiny incurrent and excurrent openings by a three-lobed flap of skin in front, of which the central lobe forms a slender barbel that reaches past the mouth. The horizontally oval eyes are equipped with rudimentary nictitating membranes (protective third eyelids) and placed rather high on the head, with a thick ridge running under each. The mouth is wide and arched, with short furrows at the corners extending onto both jaws; the upper teeth are exposed when the mouth is closed. There are 18–30 and 13–26 tooth rows on either side of the upper and lower jaws respectively. The teeth have a narrow central cusp with a pair of small lateral cusplets; those of adult males are slightly more curved than those of females.

The body is rather laterally compressed and tapers towards the tail, with two dorsal fins set far back. The first dorsal fin originates over the rear of the pelvic fins and is much larger than the second, which originates over the midpoint of the anal fin base. The bases of the pectoral and pelvic fins are about equal; the pectoral fins are large and broad while the pelvic fins are much lower. Adult males have stubby claspers with the inner margins of the pelvic fins partially fused over them to form an "apron". The caudal fin is short and broad, with an indistinct lower lobe and a ventral notch near the tip of the upper lobe. The very thick skin is covered by well-calcified dermal denticles. Each denticle has an arrowhead-shaped crown with three posterior points, mounted on a short stalk.

The background color of the leopard catshark ranges from off-white to glossy jet black above and white to almost black below, sometimes with an abrupt transition between the two. Overlaid is a striking pattern of black markings variously combining small to large spots, blotches, complete to incomplete rosettes, and/or short to long lines, that may extend almost to the midline of the belly. There are four named forms: 'typical', with leopard-like rosettes and broken lines, 'marleyi', with large round spots, 'salt and pepper', with densely packed dots, and 'melanistic', with an almost completely black upper surface and irregular stripes and/or spots; many sharks are intermediate between these forms. Color pattern is affected by development: all hatchling sharks have large black spots, that with age tend to break up into rosettes and smaller spots, that may eventually merge into lines. The 'marleyi' form appears to be a type of paedomorphosis, in which in the hatchling pattern is carried into adulthood. Color pattern is also related to geographic location, with the 'marleyi' and 'salt and pepper' forms apparently restricted to the waters off the Eastern Cape and KwaZulu-Natal. The leopard catshark reaches a maximum known length of 84 cm (33 in) and a maximum known weight of 3.2 kg (7.1 lb); males grow slightly larger than females.

== Biology and ecology ==
The slow-swimming leopard catshark generally spends the day resting inside caves or crevices, either alone or in groups. At night, it moves towards the shore to actively forage for small bony fishes, cephalopods, crustaceans, and polychaete worms. In False Bay, fishes are the most important prey type, followed by cephalopods and then the Cape rock lobster (Jasus lalandii). This shark has been observed attacking octopus and cuttlefish by seizing and tearing off tentacles with a twisting motion. Like its close relative the pyjama shark, it will temporarily abandon its nocturnal habits to take advantage of the daytime mass spawnings of the chokka squid (Loligo vulgaris reynaudi), which occur unpredictably year-round with a peak from October to December. The sharks lie motionless amongst the squids' egg masses with their heads hidden, and make sudden lunges at female squid that have descended to the sea floor to attach their eggs.

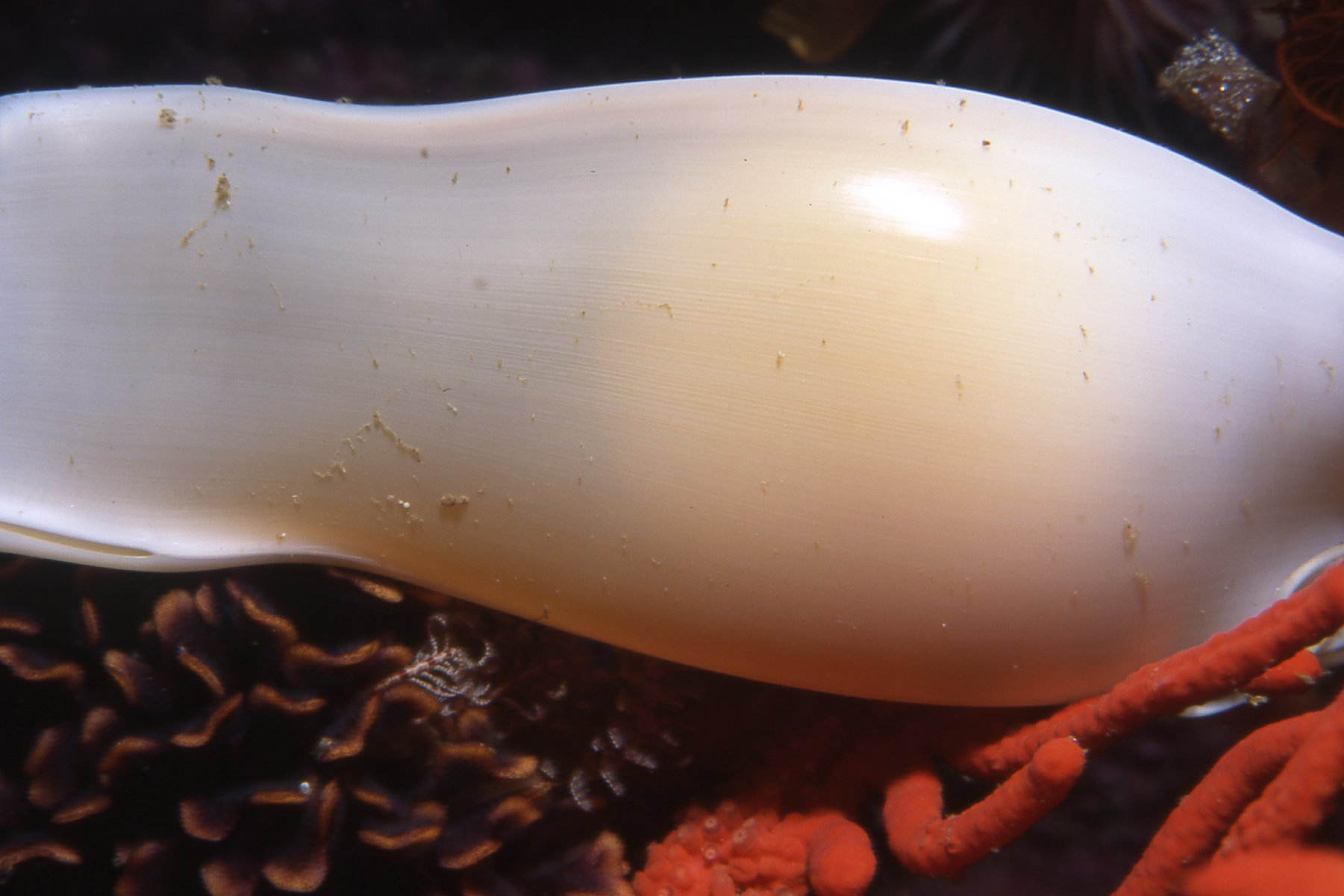
The leopard catshark produces light-colored egg capsules that it attaches to underwater structures.

The leopard catshark is oviparous and apparently reproduces throughout the year. Females produce two eggs at a time, one within each oviduct. Each egg is protected by a rectangular capsule 7 cm (2.8 in) long and 3 cm (1.2 in) across, which is light brown to olive in color and thinner-walled than those of the pyjama shark. The corners of the capsule bear long tendrils that enable the female to secure them to underwater structures. In the aquarium, the eggs hatch in approximately five and a half months. The hatchling shark measures 11 cm (4.3 in) long; males and females begin to mature sexually at 47–67 cm (19–26 in) and 43–64 cm (17–25 in) long respectively, corresponding to an age of around 10 years. One source reports the maximum lifespan as at least 15 years, while another source gives at least 19 years.

Predators of the leopard catshark include larger sharks and marine mammals; it is one of the cartilaginous fish most often consumed by the broadnose sevengill shark (Notorynchus cepedianus). When threatened, it curls into a ring with its tail covering its head, a behavior also performed by the shysharks (Haploblepharus). Its eggs are also heavily preyed upon, by animals such as the whelks Burnupena papyracea and B. lagenaria, which can pierce the outer covering to extract the yolk. This species is known to be parasitized by the praniza larvae of the isopod Gnathia pantherina, which infest the nostrils, mouth, and gills.

== Human interactions ==
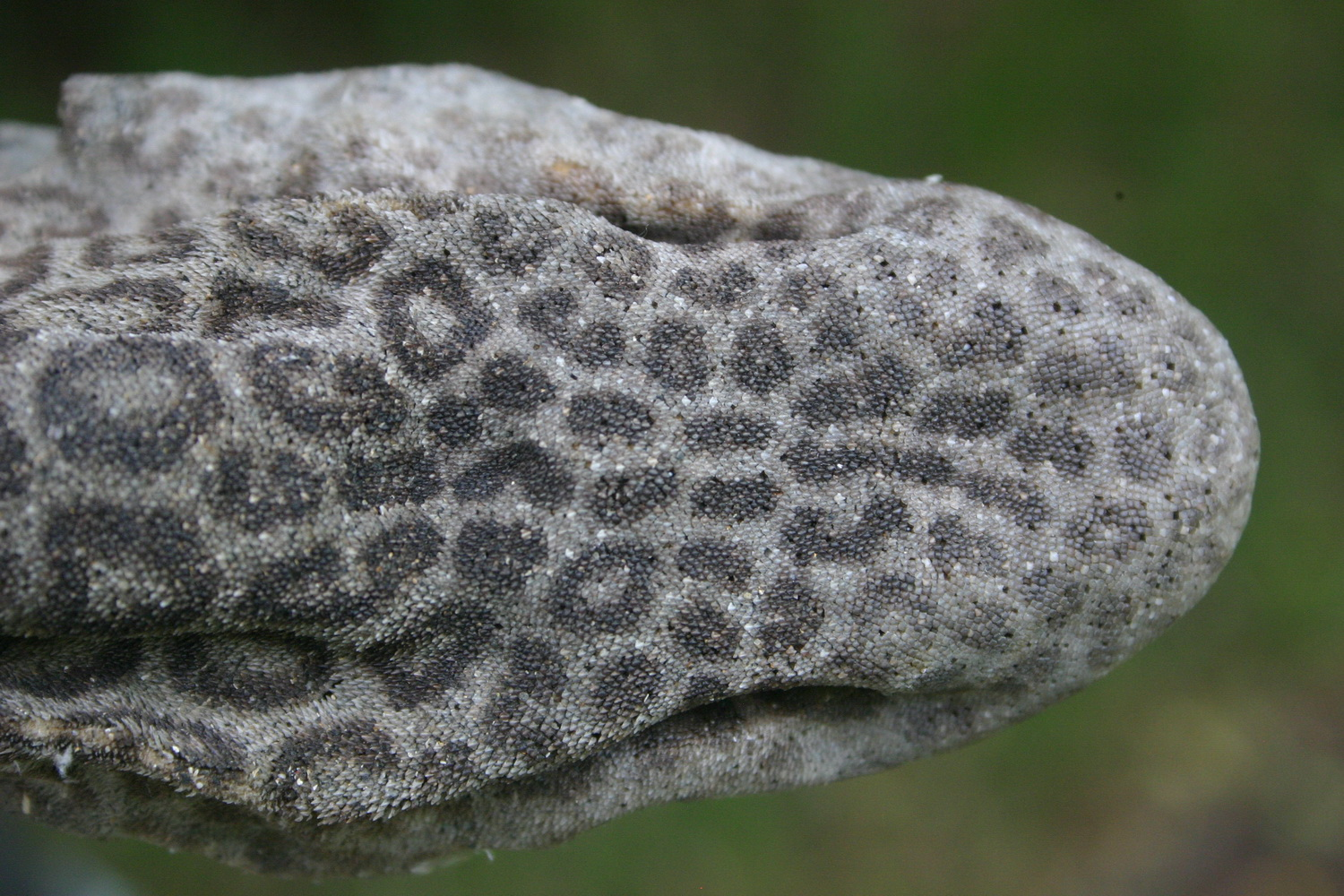
Pattern on head of wind-dried specimen

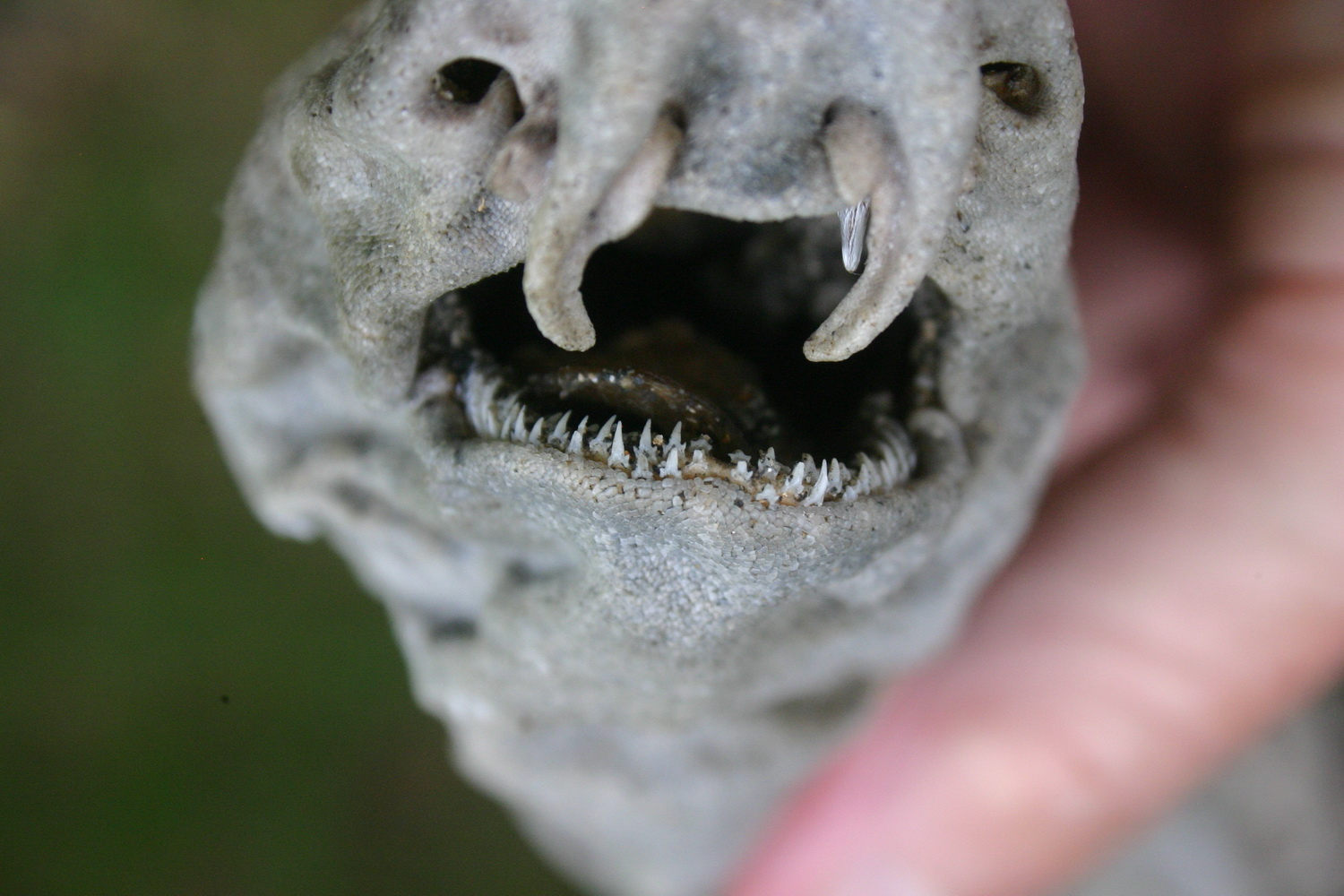
View of head showing prominent nostrils and barbels

Quite common within its range, the leopard catshark is harmless to humans. It is a popular subject of public aquariums because of its small size, attractive appearance, and hardiness. The aquarium trade supports a minor fishery that targets the two Poroderma species. This shark is regularly caught incidentally by commercial and recreational fishers, and almost invariably discarded despite being edible. Nevertheless, fishing mortality is likely to be high as many fishers using line gear make a point to kill hooked sharks, seeing them as pests that "steal" bait. The International Union for Conservation of Nature (IUCN) presently assesses the leopard catshark as least concern, though notes that its inshore habitat is heavily fished and otherwise impacted by human activity. The possible distribution of this shark across many small, distinct populations also warrants additional investigation and monitoring.
