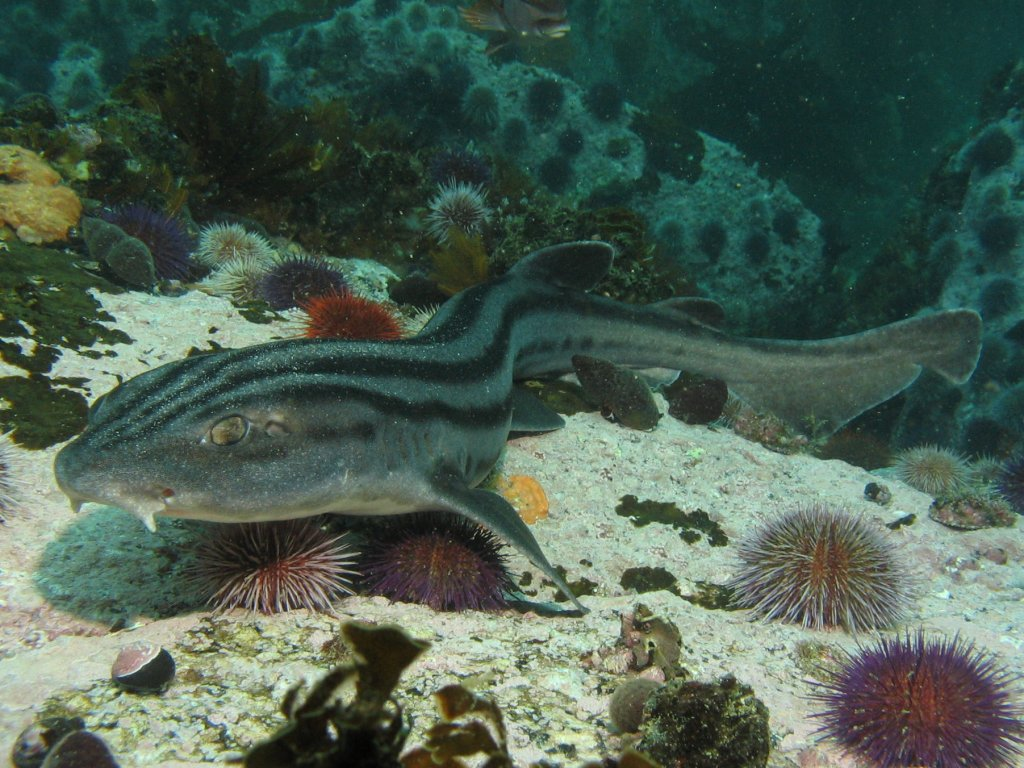
- Pyjama shark (P. africanum)
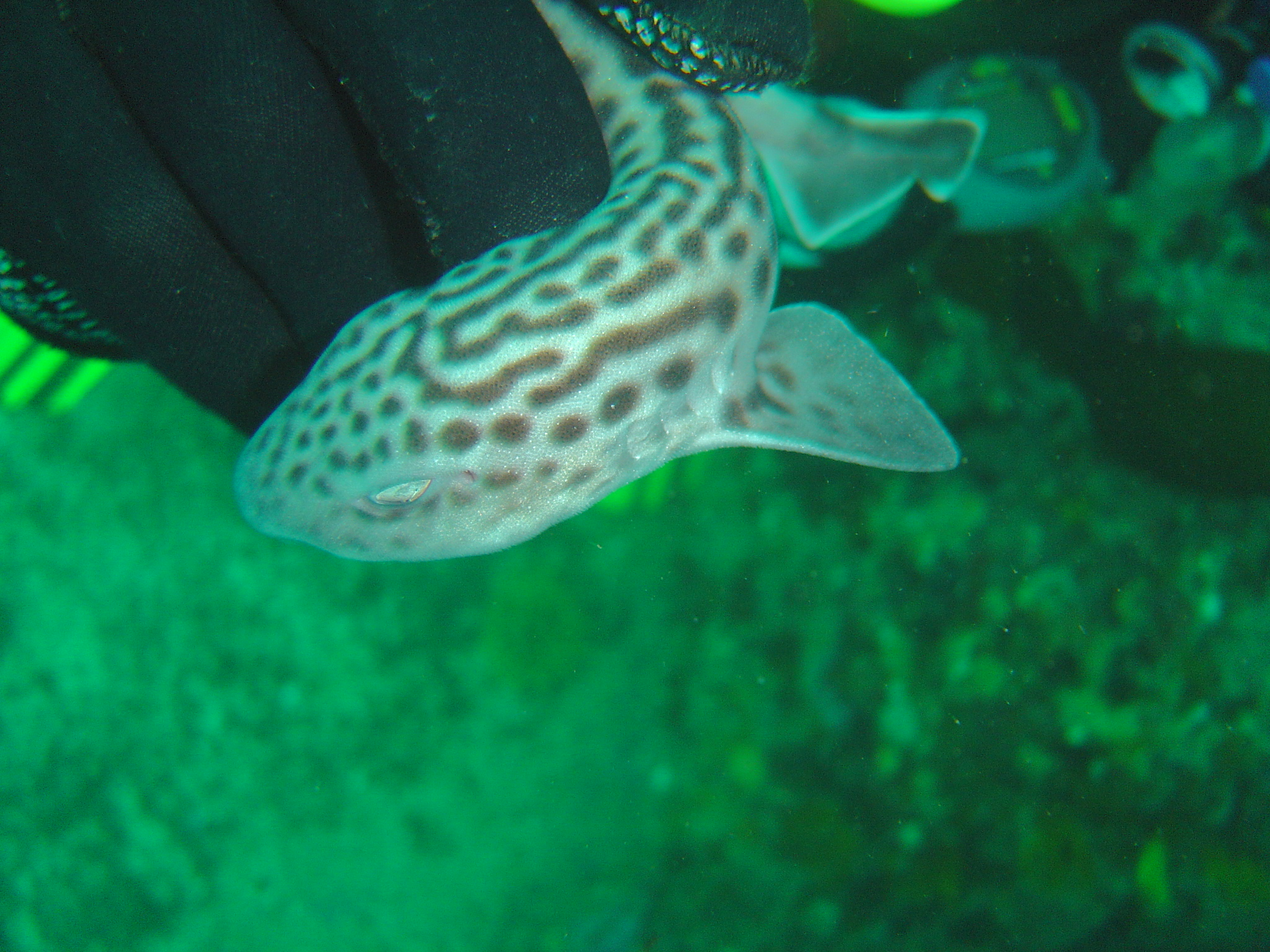
- Leopard catshark (P. pantherinum)

Scientific classification
- Kingdom: Animalia
- Phylum: Chordata
- Class: Chondrichthyes
- Subclass: Elasmobranchii
- Division: Selachii
- Order: Carcharhiniformes
- Family: Scyliorhinidae
- Genus: Poroderma; A. Smith, 1838

Type species
- Squalus africanus Gmelin, 1789

Synonyms
- Conoporoderma (subgenus of Poroderma) Fowler, 1934

= Poroderma =

Genus of sharks

Poroderma is a genus of catsharks, and part of the family Scyliorhinidae. The color of these sharks are usually grey with dark stripes. They are found in South Africa and are nocturnal. They live preferably in shore areas, close to the bottom, to depths of 100 m. They prefer small caves and crevices. Their diet usually consists of crustaceans, but they also feed on small fish. Their average size is between 60 and 80 cm, with a maximum total length of about 100 cm. Their birth size is about 15 cm. They are harmless to humans.

== Species ==
- Poroderma africanum (J. F. Gmelin, 1789) (striped catshark or pyjama shark)
- Poroderma pantherinum (J. P. Müller & Henle, 1838) (leopard catshark)
