= Atlantic squid =

Atlantic squid can refer to:

- Loligo pealei, the common Atlantic squid
- Loligo forbesii, the eastern Atlantic squid
