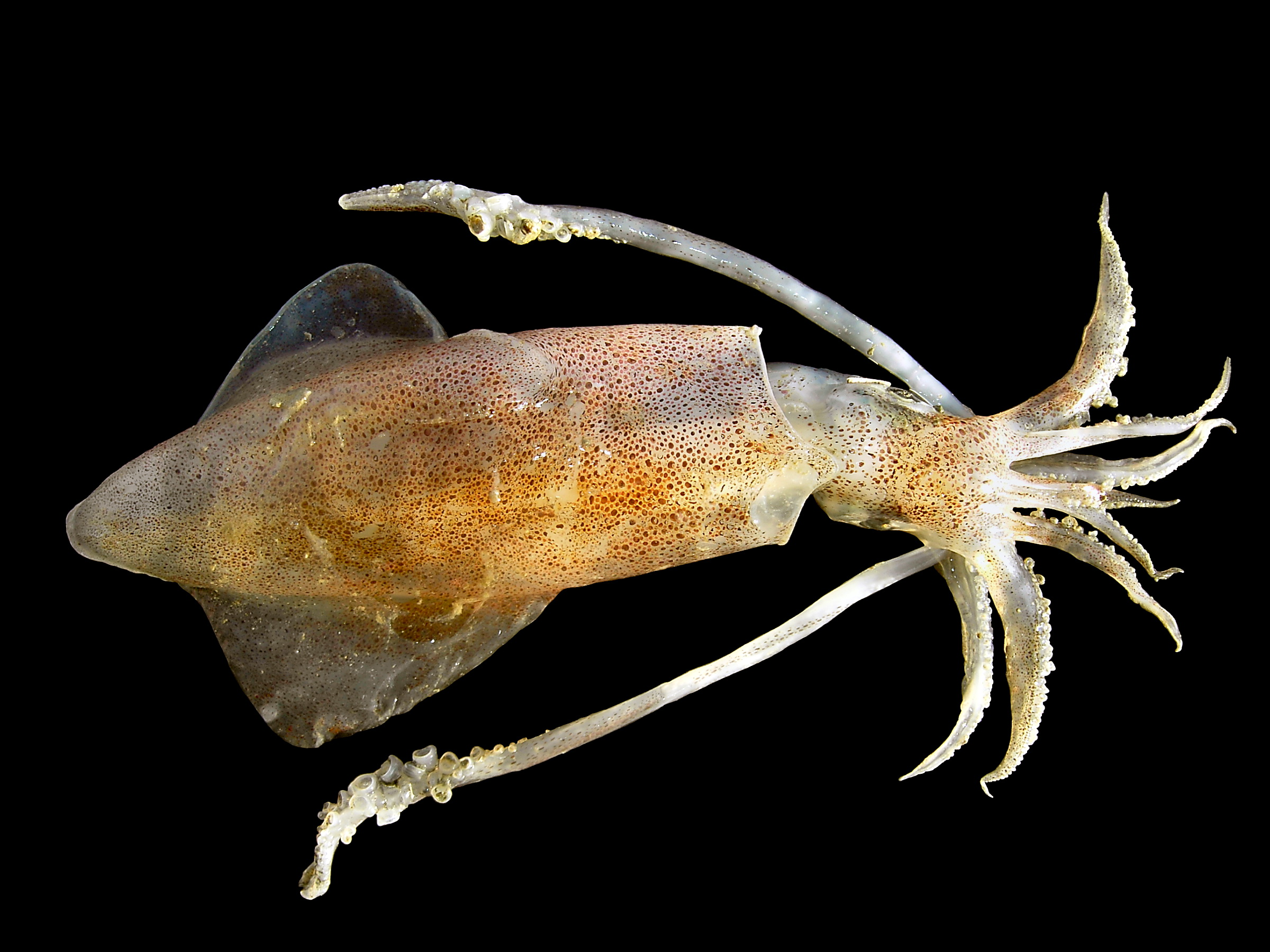

Conservation status
- Data Deficient (IUCN 3.1)

Scientific classification
- Kingdom: Animalia
- Phylum: Mollusca
- Class: Cephalopoda
- Order: Myopsida
- Family: Loliginidae
- Genus: Loligo
- Species: L. vulgaris

Binomial name
- Loligo vulgaris Lamarck, 1798

Synonyms
- Loligo affinis Lafont, 1871; Loligo berthelotii Vérany, 1839; Loligo breviceps Steenstrup, 1862; Loligo mediterranea Targioni-Tozzetti, 1869; Loligo microcephala Lafont, 1871; Loligo neglecta Gray, 1849; Loligo pulchra Blainville, 1823; Loligo rangii Férussac, 1835; Sepia loligo Linnaeus, 1758

= European squid =

Species of cephalopod

The European squid or common squid (Loligo vulgaris) is a large squid belonging to the family Loliginidae. It occurs abundantly in coastal waters from the North Sea to at least the west coast of Africa. This species lives from sea level to depths of 500 m (1,600 ft). Its mantle is up to 40 cm (16 in) long. The species is extensively exploited by commercial fisheries.

Loligo reynaudii, the Cape Hope squid, was previously treated as a subspecies of L. vulgaris.

== Description ==
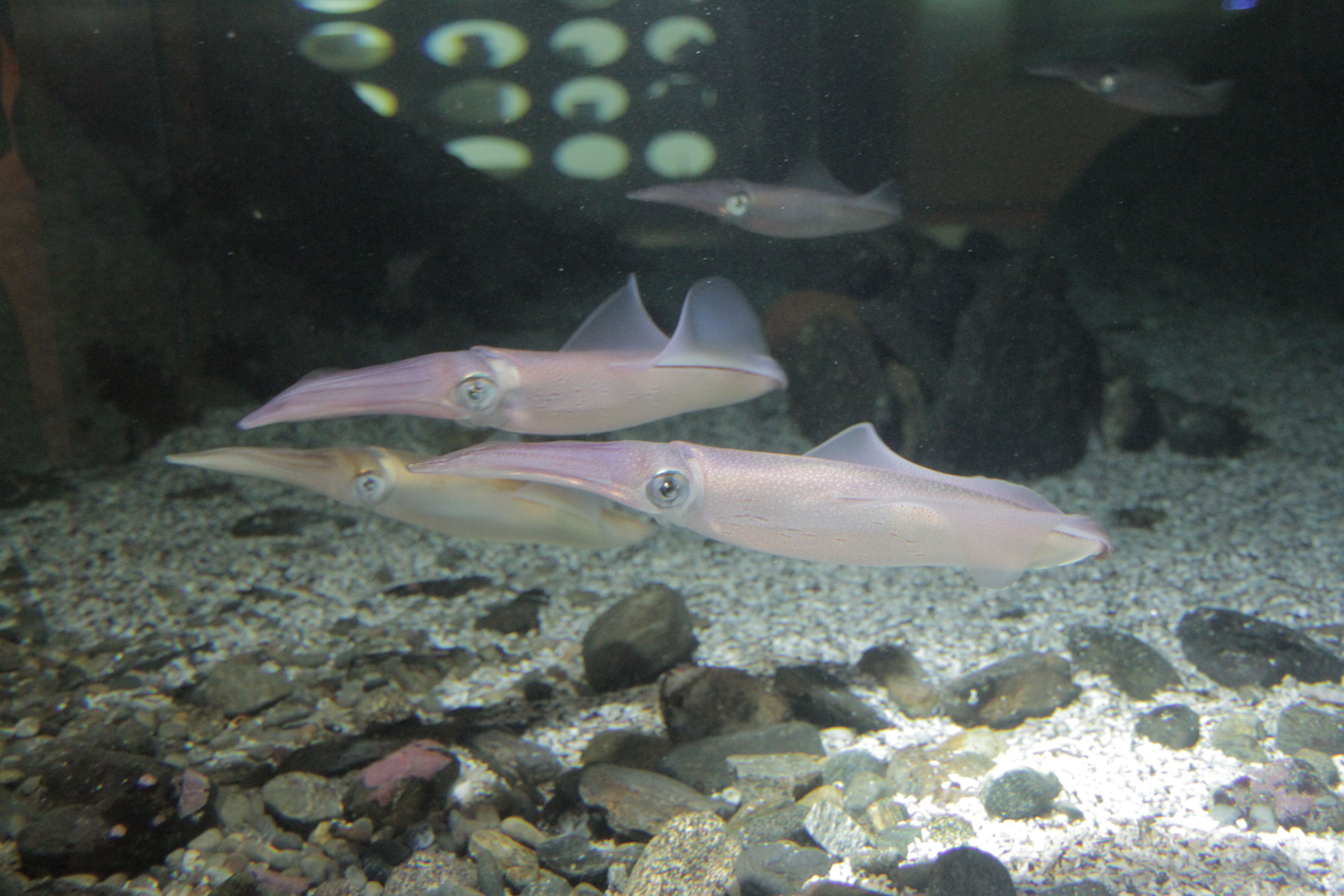
A group in the Aquarium Finisterrae, Spain

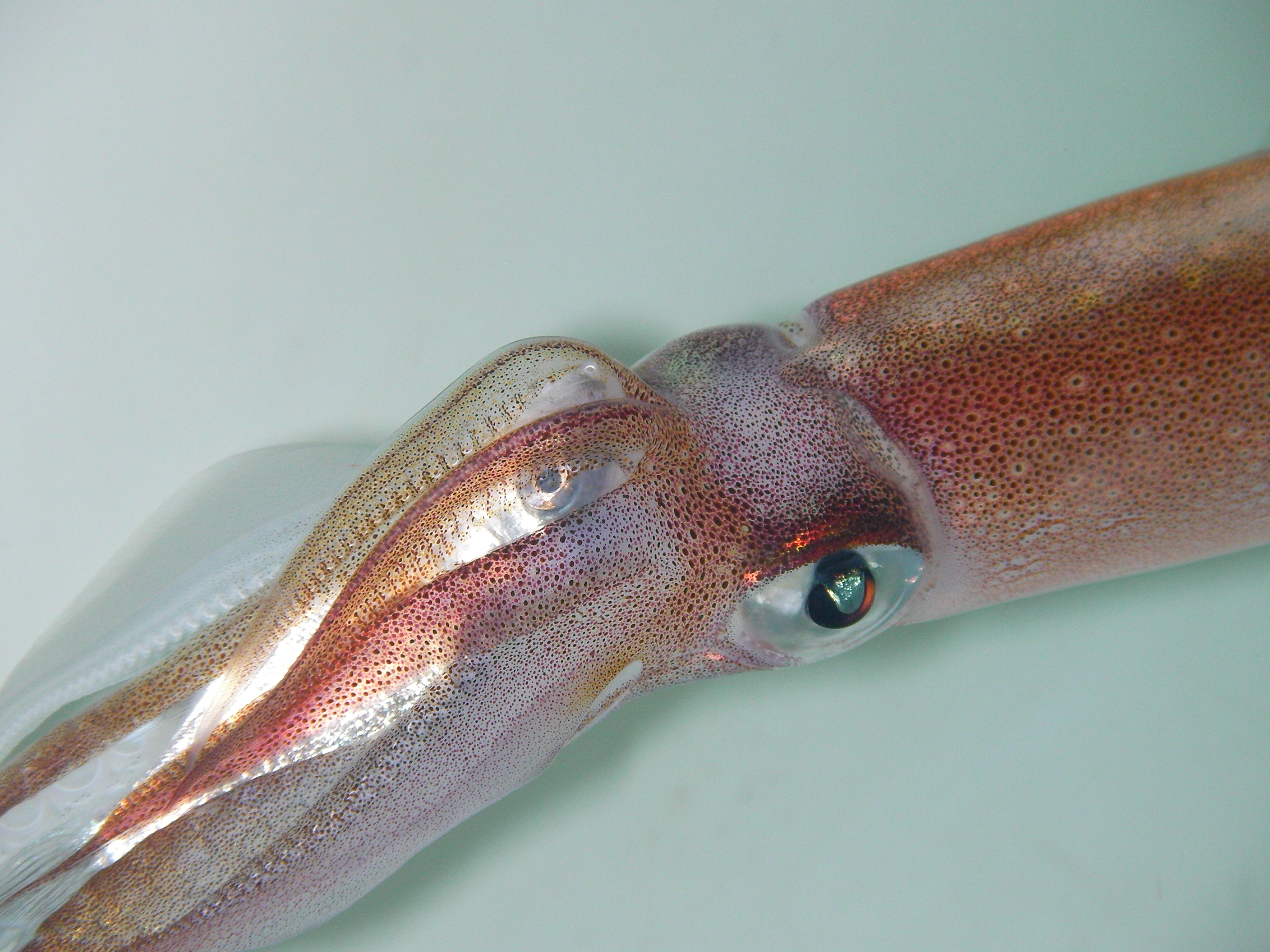
Loligo vulgaris with captured Sparus aurata

The European squid has a long, moderately slender and cylindrical body. Rhomboid fins comprise two-thirds of the mantle length, though locomotion is via jet propulsion. The posterior border is slightly concave. The head is relatively small and has large eyes which are covered with a transparent membrane. Like almost all squid, this species has ten limbs surrounding the mouth and beak: eight are relatively short arms, and two, which form the tentacles, are long, as they are used to catch prey. The fourth left arm of males is a hectocotylus. The European squid can grow up to 30–40 cm in the mantle length, but more usually they are 15–25 cm long. The males are generally bigger than the females and exhibit more rapid rates of growth.

The colour of the European squid is greyish-transparent or reddish, depending on the expansion of chromatophores in the dermis. Males have small chromatophores on their mantle.

== Habitat and distribution ==
The European squid is a neritic, semidemersal species, which undertakes distinct horizontal and vertical migrations, depending on the environment. In the Adriatic Sea, European squid can be found above various substrates, from sandy through to the muddy bottoms. It is found in temperatures of 13°C–20°C, preferring 18°C.

L. vulgaris is found throughout the Mediterranean and in the eastern Atlantic Ocean from the North Sea to the Gulf of Guinea. In British waters, it is mainly found in the Irish Sea, along the south coast of England, and off northern Scotland.

== Biology ==
This species can be found at depths from the surface to about 500 m, but it is most abundant between 20 and 250 m (deeper during the winter). The population in the northeastern Atlantic spends the winter in deeper waters off Portugal, then moves towards the coast of France in spring, before migrating farther north into the North Sea during May and June where they spawn in depths ranging from 20 to 80 m. A southward migration takes place in autumn. The population found off Morocco and Western Sahara similarly spends the winter in deeper offshore waters and moves inshore to spawn in spring and autumn. The main juvenile recruitment is in February and March and between July and September. In the western Mediterranean, European squid move into deeper water in late autumn; the largest individuals commence their inshore migration as early as in January and February, while the smaller individuals wait until summer.

The spawning season extends for most of the year, but climaxes in early summer and early autumn. Females lay up to 20,000 small eggs, which are deposited in gelatinous tubes containing tens of eggs each. These tubes are attached to debris and other solid objects on sandy to muddy bottoms. The incubation period is dependent on temperature and is between 25 days (at 22 °C) and 45 days (at 12 to 14 °C). The size of the male determines the number (up to 800) and size of spermatophores. Males that are reproducing for the second time usually carry more than those reproducing for the first time.

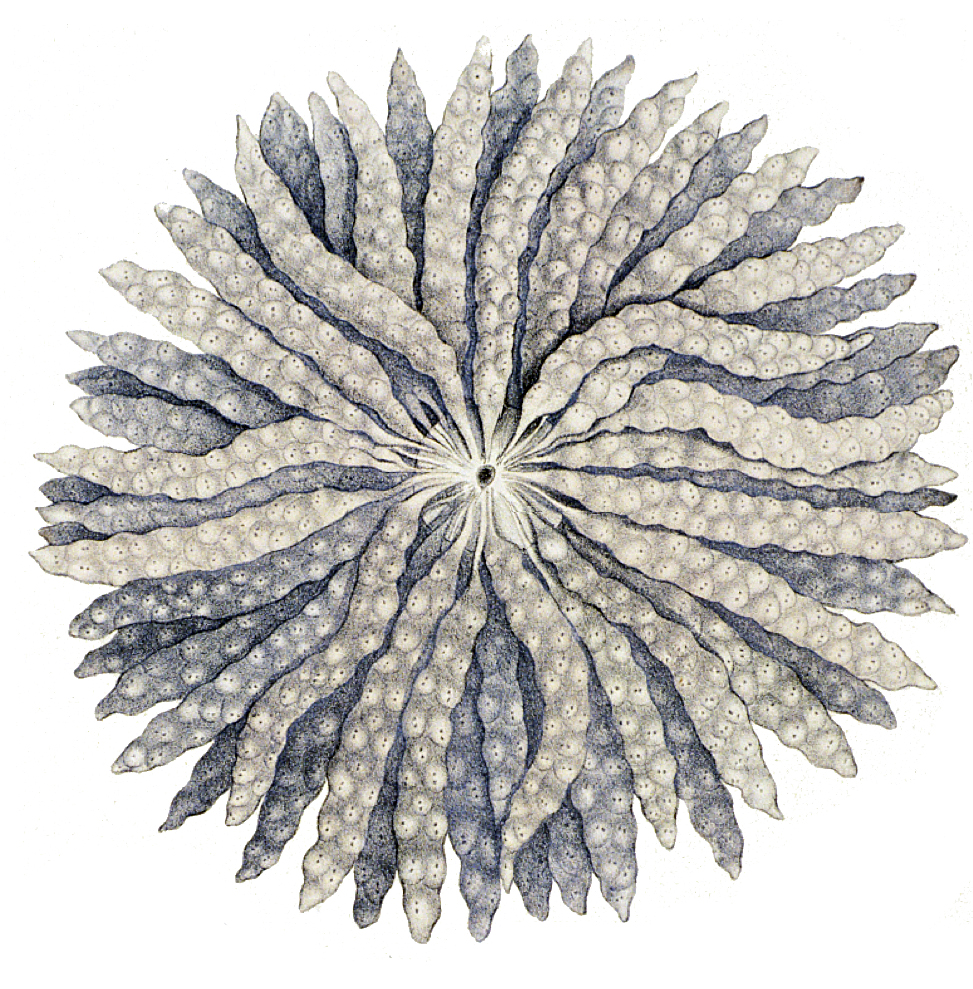
Egg mass

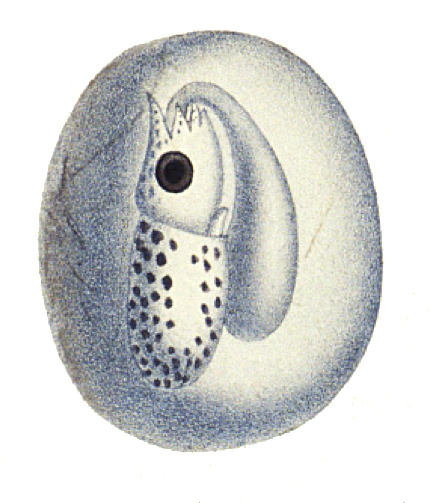
Embryo

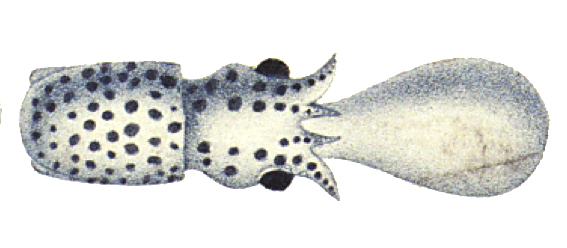
Embryo

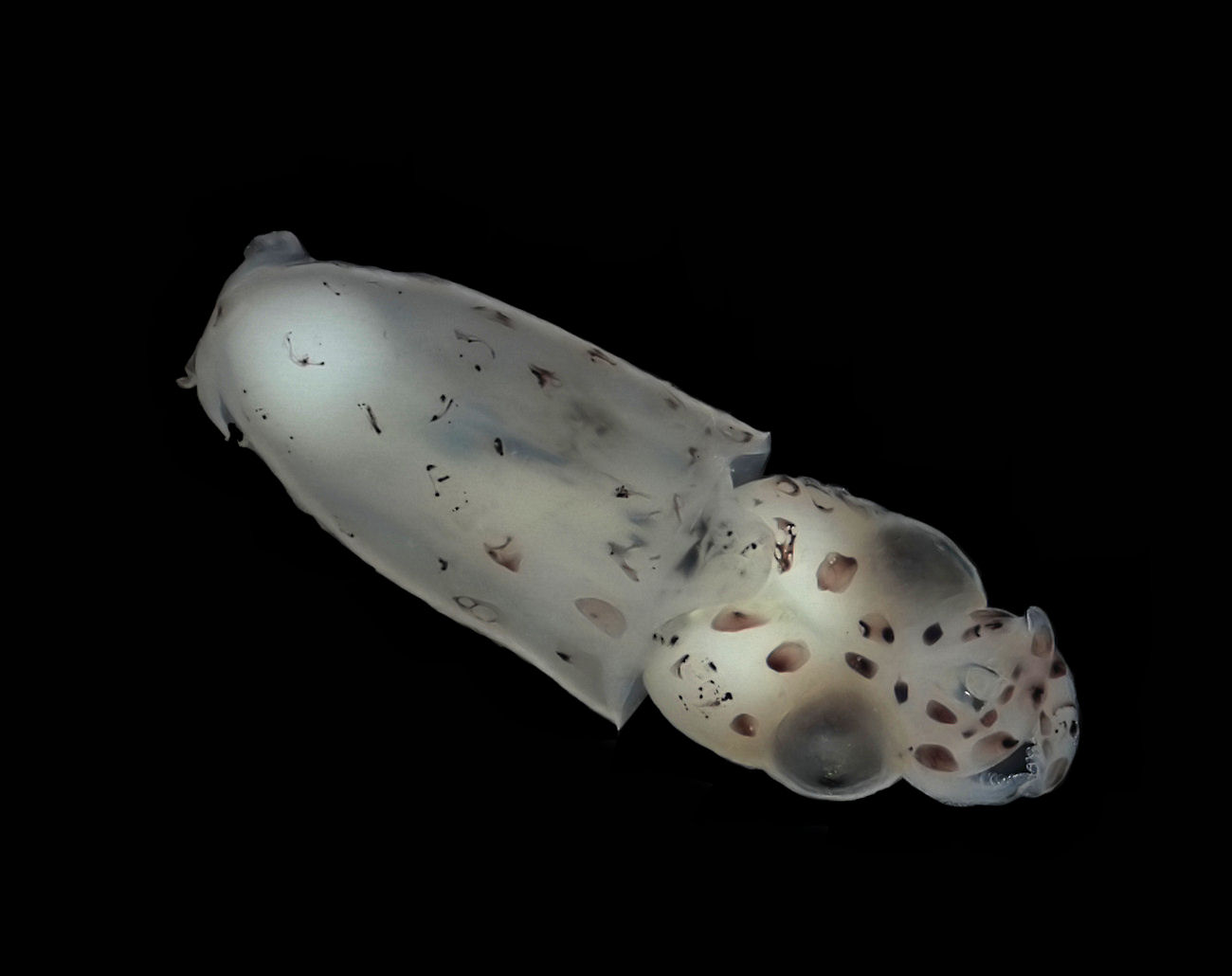
Juvenile

Growth in both sexes is temperature-dependent and is therefore faster in summer than in winter; the males grow faster than females. In the Atlantic, young squid hatched in June reach a mantle length of around 12 cm by December and grow to 13 or 14 cm by the following April. By August, males attain a mantle length of 17.5 cm and, if they reach the following April, 21 cm, compared to 17 cm in females. Life expectancy is 2 years in females and about 3 years in males.

European squid are predators on fishes and crustaceans. Cannibalism is common.

== Fisheries ==
The European squid is a commercially valuable species. It is caught in multispecies trawl fishing throughout the year and, seasonally, in small scale and recreational fishing with a variety of gear.

In the Adriatic Sea, the total annual catch of the species is around 1,000 to 1,500 tonnes. This is very variable and is probably linked to the annual reproduction cycle that is typical for many cephalopods.

== See also ==
- Todarodes pacificus (Japanese common squid)
