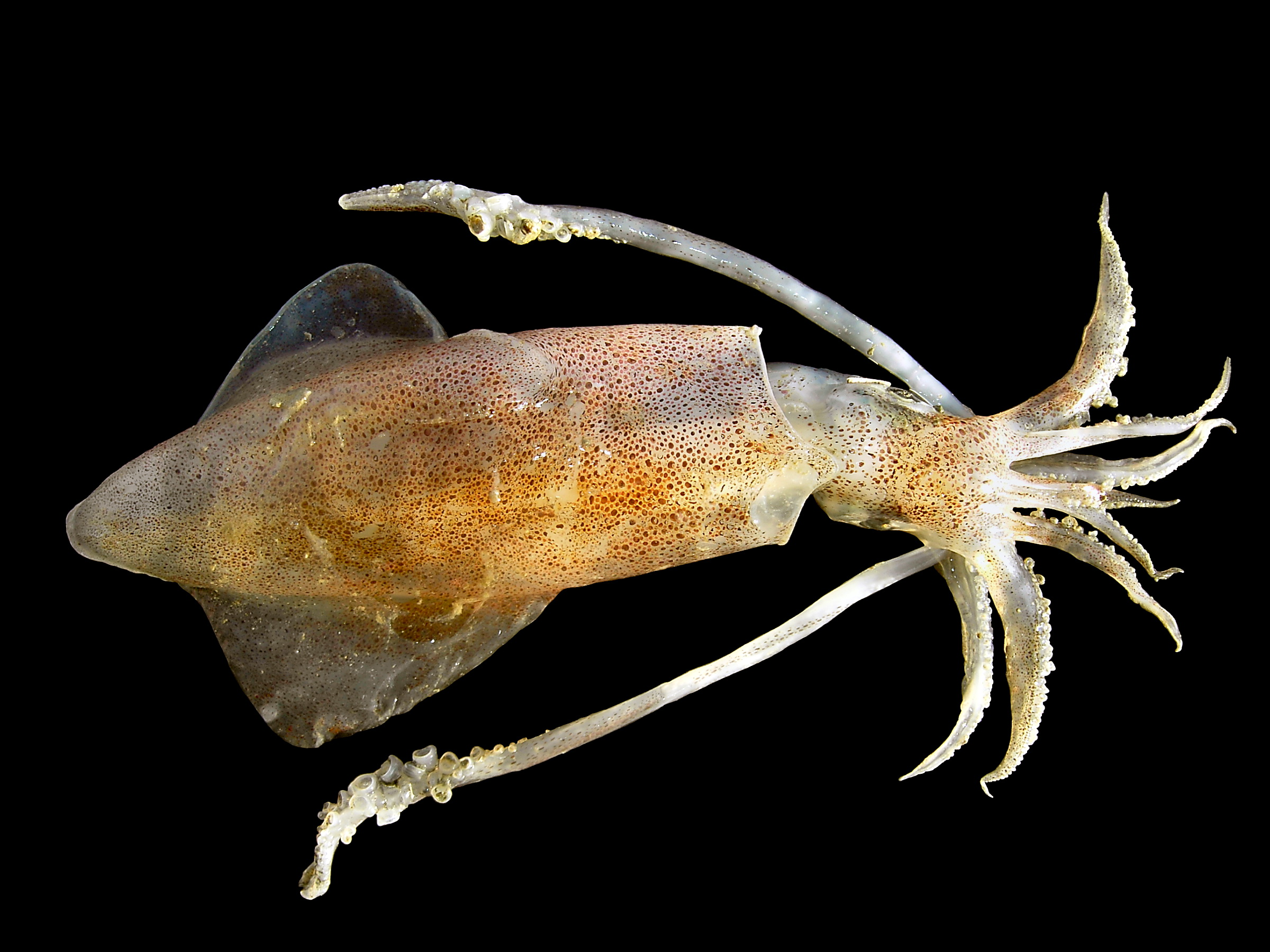
- Live specimen of L. vulgaris from the Belgian continental shelf, photographed on board the RV Belgica. (ML: 138 mm, MW: 39 mm)

Scientific classification
- Domain: Eukaryota
- Kingdom: Animalia
- Phylum: Mollusca
- Class: Cephalopoda
- Order: Myopsida
- Family: Loliginidae
- Genus: Loligo; Lamarck, 1798

Type species
- Loligo vulgaris Lamarck, 1798

Synonyms
- Pteroteuthis Ehrenberg, 1831

= Loligo =

Loligo Temporal range: Eocene - recent

Genus of squids

Loligo is a genus of squid and one of the most representative and widely distributed groups of myopsid squid.

The genus was first described by Jean Baptiste Lamarck in 1798. However, the name had been used earlier than Lamarck (Schneider, 1784; Linnaeus, 1758) and might even have been used by Pliny. In the early 19th century, this generic name was often used as a grouping for all true squid.

All three species of Loligo are caught by commercial fisheries, most abundantly by traditional trawling methods (mobile gear). In the United States of America, Longfin squid are federally regulated under the Atlantic Mackerel, Squid, and Butterfish Management Plan. Loligo vulgaris and others are noted for being attracted to lights at night; they can therefore be fished using different light-attraction methods. Commercial fishing is heavily regulated in the United States, and fishing using mobile gear is only permitted during daylight hours. However, the recreational fisherman is often found sitting by a light at the pier, happily jigging for squid with a rod and reel.

Loligo is the oldest true squid genus known from fossil remains; statoliths assigned to the extinct species Loligo applegatei are known from the early Eocene. In addition, a pyritized imprint of a Loligo squid is known from the Oligocene of Krasnodar, Russia, marking the first true squid known from a complete body fossil. The squid appears to have suffocated in anoxic bottom water while attempting to eat an extinct cutlassfish (Anenchelum).

== Species ==
The recent classification of Vecchione et al. (2005)[1] and the Tree of Life Web Project (2010)[2] recognises only three species within Loligo, many others having been split off in other loliginid genera.

- Loligo forbesii, veined squid
- Loligo reynaudii, Cape Hope squid or chokka
- Loligo vulgaris, European squid

== Synapomorphies ==
Unlike many genera that can be described by commonalities inherited exclusively from their common ancestor, the classification of a species as being in the genus Loligo is not based on positive discrimination. The only positive distinction is not based on any form of inheritance and has to do with its Eastern Atlantic distribution. Other than this, the grounds for grouping a squid in this taxon is exclusively based on its lacking of characteristics that would put it in another taxon. Thus all squid in Loligo have rhomboidal fins as adults, elongated mantles, fins whose length exceeds their breadth, and lack photophores, but all other squid genera do as well.

== Mating ==
Mating in this genus is aseasonal. Such breeding is referred to as continuous breeding. Loligo squid gather near the surface of the water and males frenzy for females. Insertion of a sperm sac into the female is done with the tentacles of a male. The female then lays the fertilized eggs in roughly twenty jelly-filled sacs, each containing 200-300 eggs. Hatching occurs after three to four weeks, and complete sexual maturation takes roughly three years.

== Educational uses ==
Squid of the genus Loligo have widely been used in first year biology laboratories. Aside from being highly affordable, preserved and readily available for purchase online, the relative size of a specimen in this genus is perfect for laboratory use. Averaging at roughly 20 to 50 cm (8 to 20 inches) in length, the squid is small enough to fit on a typical dissection tray while large enough to have very visible structures for easy identifiability.

== Human consumption ==
Squid of genus Loligo are widely consumed by humans. In the United States, commercial fishing for squid is federally regulated and yearly quotas are set by NOAA. Even with all the squid caught and consumed by humans, it does not threaten the genus because of its members’ prolific breeding habits. Loligo squid are available for fishing all year round, within the limits of the federally set quotas, and this greatly increases their desirability for industrial fisheries. This squid, when cooked, is what is commonly called calamari.

Taxon identifiers	EoL: 38585; GBIF: 2289182; ITIS: 82370; NCBI: 6616; Fossilworks: 15957; WoRMS: 138139
