= Loligo reynaudii =

Cape Hope squid

Conservation status
- Least Concern (IUCN 3.1)

Scientific classification
- Kingdom: Animalia
- Phylum: Mollusca
- Class: Cephalopoda
- Order: Myopsida
- Family: Loliginidae
- Genus: Loligo
- Species: L. reynaudii

Binomial name
- Loligo reynaudii d'Orbigny, 1841

Synonyms
- Loligo vulgaris reynaudii

Species of squid

Loligo reynaudii, commonly known as the Cape Hope squid or chokka squid, is a 20–30 cm (7.9–11.8 in) long squid belonging to the family Loliginidae. In South Africa it is known as either calamari or chokka.

It was previously treated as a subspecies of Loligo vulgaris, the European squid.

== Description ==
Loligo reynaudii is a marine cephalopod characterized by its elongated slender body, eight short arms, and two long retractile tentacles adorned with suckers. With diamond-shaped fins spanning over half the length of its up to 40 cm (16 in) mantle, this species exhibits distinctive features. Its eyes are covered by a membrane integrated into the head's skin. Notably, the left ventral arm serves as a storage and transfer site for spermatophores, featuring modified distal parts with rows of 44 to 68 tiny outgrowths. Its expanded limbs display transverse rows of suckers, with an enlarged median segment and smooth horny rings. The mantle length measures around 78 mm. Along with reddish-brown pigment and light-reflecting cells on the head and mantle, its coloration can range from dark red to nearly translucent while alive.

== Distribution ==
Loligo reynaudii is widely distributed in a diverse and variable environment, primarily found between the Orange River and Port Alfred, with significant populations also present in Southern Angola where spawning takes place (Guerra et al.). Its distribution is strongly influenced by the warm and fast-flowing Agulhas Current along the oceanography of South Africa's east coast and outer Agulhas Bank. Notably, more than two-thirds of the adult biomass of L. reynaudii is concentrated along the southeast coast of South Africa. Loligo reynaudii can be found across a depth range from sea level down to 200 m (660 ft).

== Ecology ==
The South African squid is an important predator of small fishes. It forms dense breeding aggregations in bays between Cape Point and Port Elizabeth in summer, laying sausage-shaped bunches of egg bundles on the sea floor. The young are transported west by the Agulhas Current and mature on the Agulhas Bank. They then migrate eastwards as adults back to their spawning grounds.

Its natural predators include short-tail stingrays, diamond rays, spotted ragged-tooth sharks, Cape fur seals, cat sharks and numerous species of fish and birds.

== Fisheries ==
The conservation status of Cape hope squid has been evaluated using a biomass-based stock assessment model, with results measured in terms of person-days permitted in the fishery (DAFF, 2014). Recent assessments have shown a decline in squid biomass and limited resources compared to previous years, posing potential economic challenges for the fishing industry during periods of reduced production (DAFF, 2014). Consequently, it was recommended to reduce the current fishing pressure, as it was heavily exploited in 2014.

In the updated stock assessment conducted in 2019, there has been a continued increase in biomass. However, fishing effort has remained below the recommended Total Allowable Effort (TAE) levels, despite an overall upward trend (DAFF, 2019). This suggests that fishing activity has not reached unsustainable levels and is being managed within acceptable limits.
