= Aerial locomotion in marine animals =

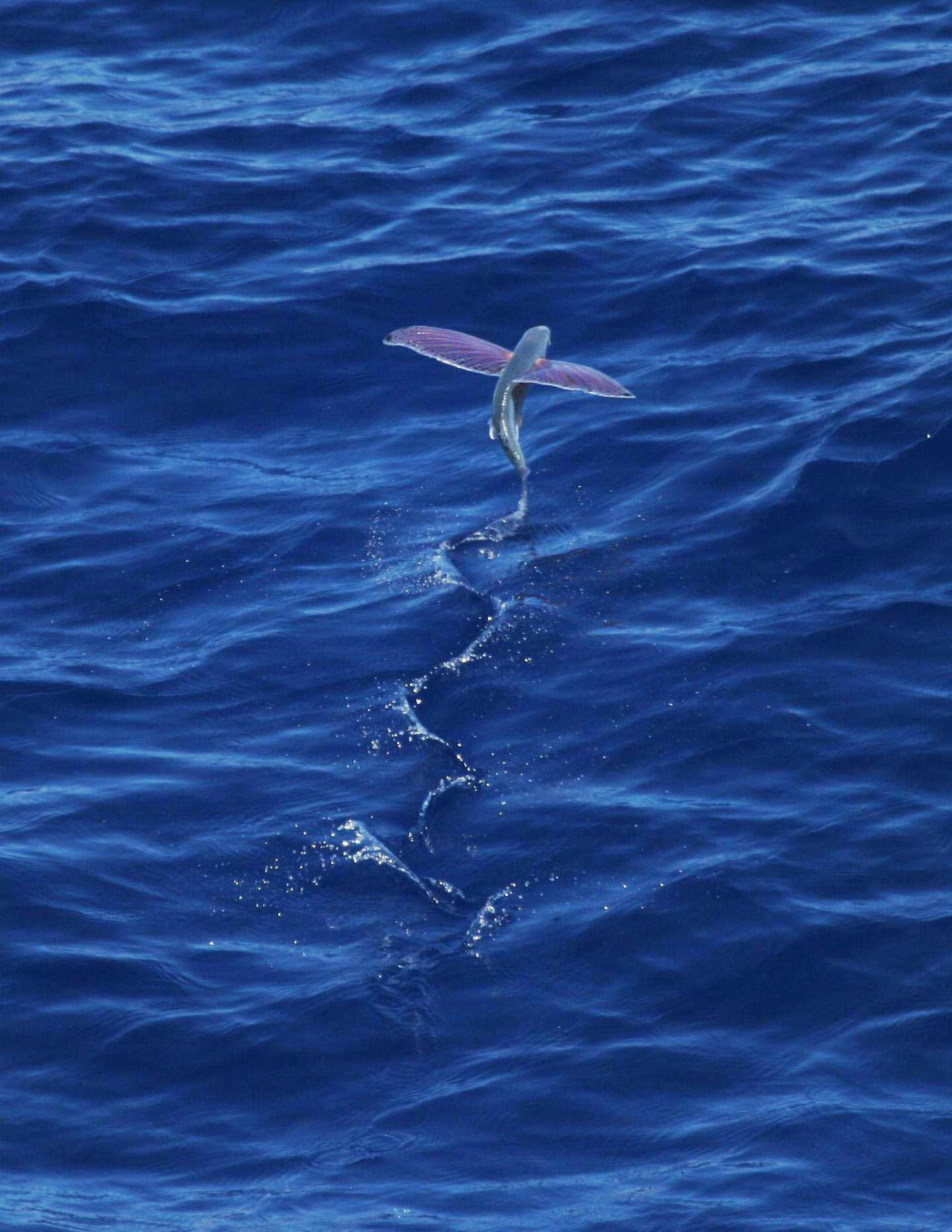
Flying fish taxis after taking off from underwater.

Various marine animals are capable of aerial locomotion, i.e., jumping out of the water and moving through air. Some possible reasons for this behavior are hunting, escaping from predators, and saving energy for swimming or breathing. Some of the jumping behaviors initiate gliding and taxiing in air, while some of them end up falling back to water.

== Penetrating water surface ==
The speed of motion in air is faster than in water because of drag. The drag force is proportional to density of the fluid. Its direction is oppositional that of the marine animal leaving the water will feel almost no drag, since air density is 1,000 times less than water density. Usually, animals gain thrust for the jumping as they travel underwater. Some of these maneuvers are group behavior and appear synchronized to an observer.

== Mechanism ==
=== Porpoising ===
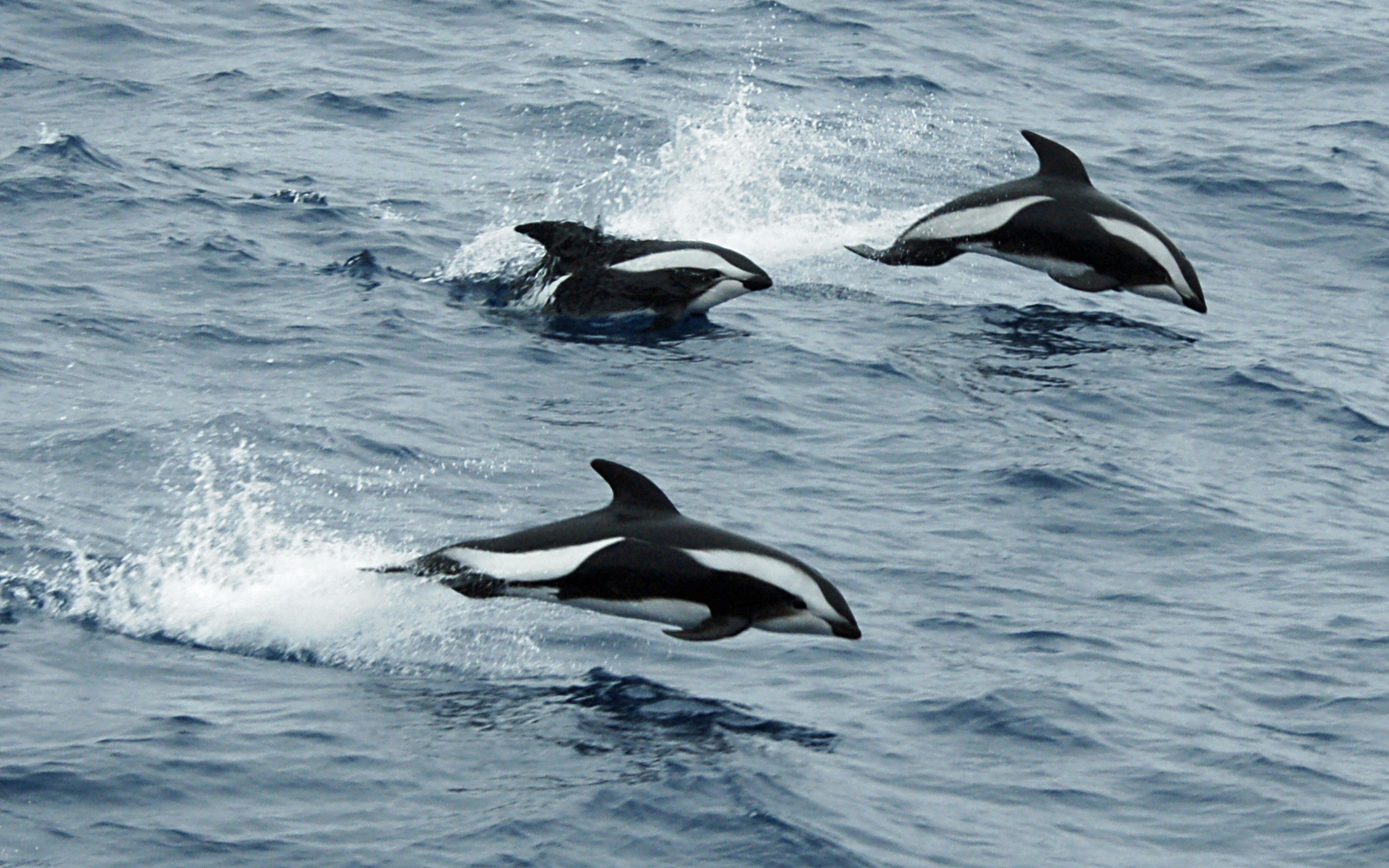
Hourglass dolphins hopping in Drake Passage

Porpoising is high-speed swimming close to water surface with many leaving and re-entering the water nose-first, seen with cetacean surfacing behaviour and breaching behaviors seen in penguins, pinnipeds and many fish in the wild. Dolphins and porpoises purposefully use porpoising to save energy when swimming high-speed. Penguin porpoises in group for long-distance traveling, and seals porpoise as group play

=== Tail beating ===
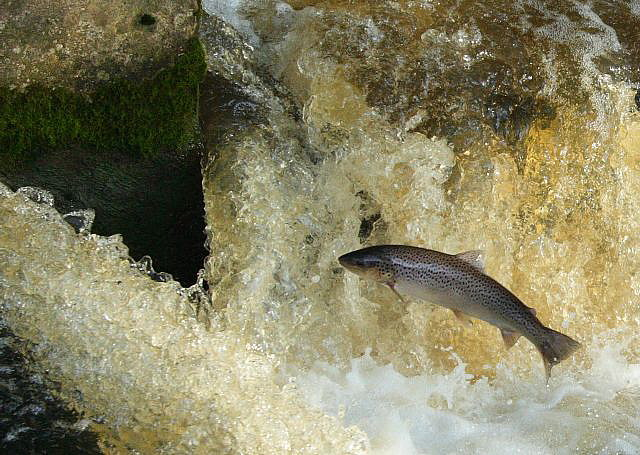
A sea trout leaping to clear a fish ladder at Westwater Reservoir, Scottish Borders

The fish approach the water surface at high speed (about 10 m/s in large fish; 20-30 body lengths/s) with their lateral fins furled against the body. They get accelerated by beating their tails rapidly, and break through the water surface at a shallow angle to the horizontal. Ray-finned fish in the orders Beloniformes and Salmoniformes have this jumping behavior. The ray-finned fish includes needlefish, flyingfish, halfbeak, and sauries. Salmon and trout jump when in fresh water to prey on low-flying insects or to overcome weirs, rapids and small waterfalls during anadromous migrations upstreams for spawning.

=== C-start ===
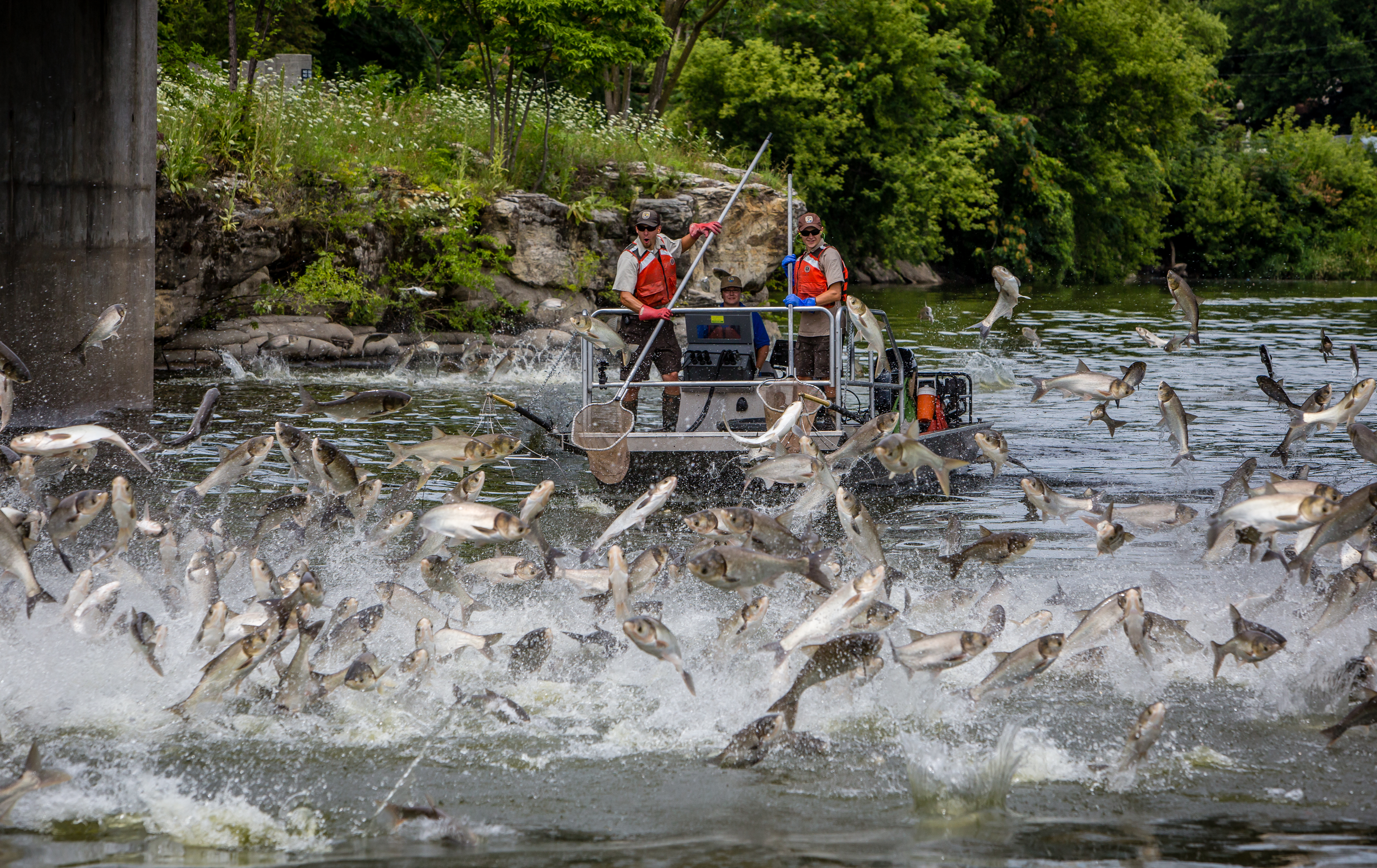
Silver carp jumping en masse in Fox River

C-start is escape reflex employed by most of the fish that jump out of water. The fish curves its slender body into a shape of letter "C" before the vigorously straightening the tail like a spring, which propels the fish with enough force to breach the water surface. Freshwater butterflyfish jumps out of water by curving its body. The fish is known for its enlarged pectoral fins but it falls back to water instead of gliding. Freshwater hatchetfish exhibits a ballistic aerial path.

=== Jet propulsion ===
Jet propulsion generates thrust and momentum by shooting out water jets. Flying squid is known for their behavior of leaping out of the water. Ommastrephinae and Todarodinae are two subfamilies of squids under the family of Ommastrephidae. They utilize jet propulsion to jump out of water as they do underwater, including Japanese flying squid.., Humboldt squid, Neon flying squid, sevenstar flying squid, and Wellington flying squid. Squid flight may be thought to reduce the cost of migration. The acceleration of Sthenoteuthis pteropus in air is 265 body lengths/s^{2} (24.5 m/s^{2}), which is found to exceed that in water (79 body lengths/s^{2}).

=== Other ===
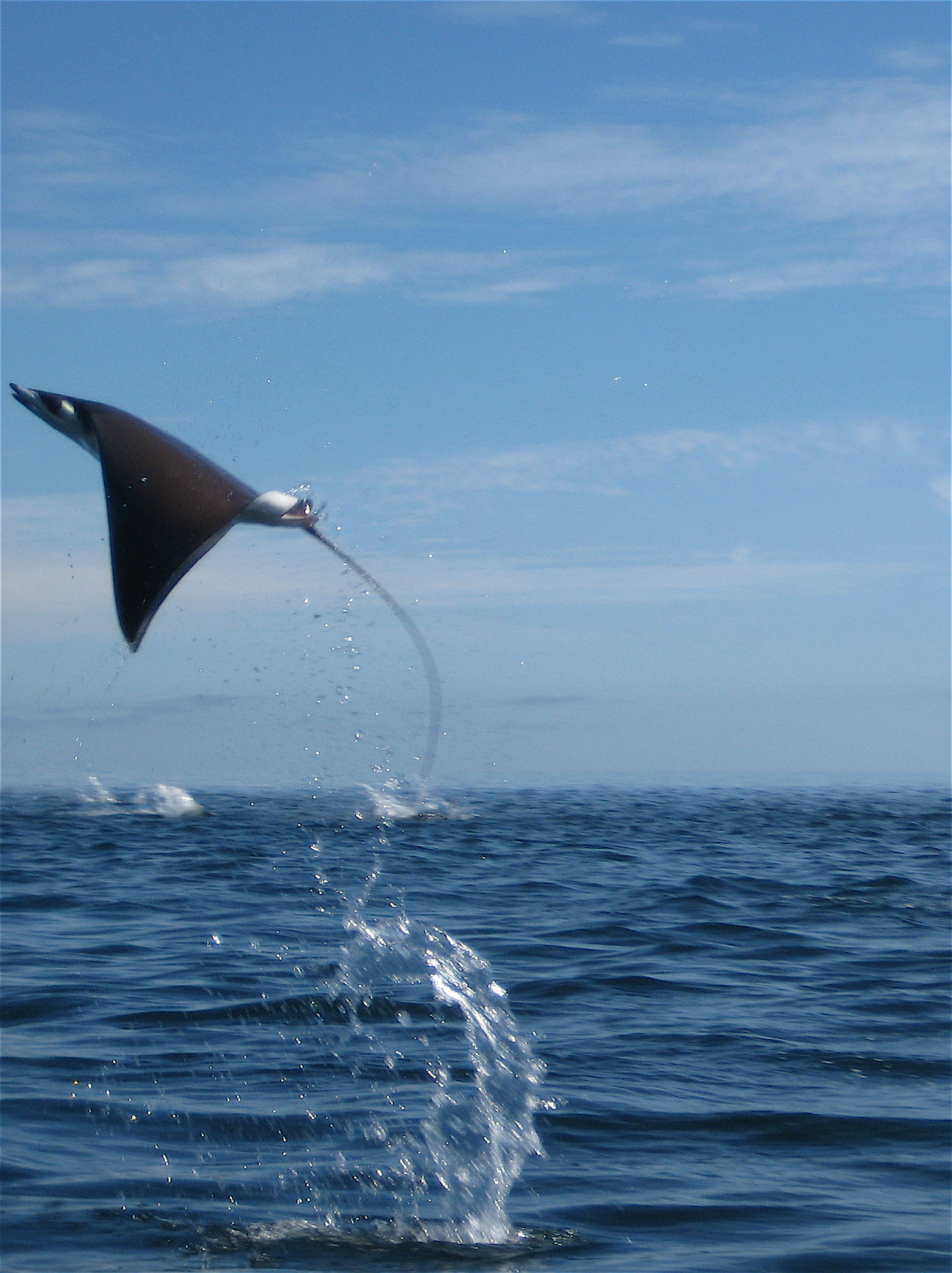
Mobula jumps out of water.

The mechanisms and jumping patterns of some aquatic animals are not clear. Mobula penetrates sea surface by many photo evidences. Great white shark attacks seals near water surface at Seal Island in South Africa

== See also ==
- Tradeoffs for locomotion in air and water
- Flying and gliding animals
