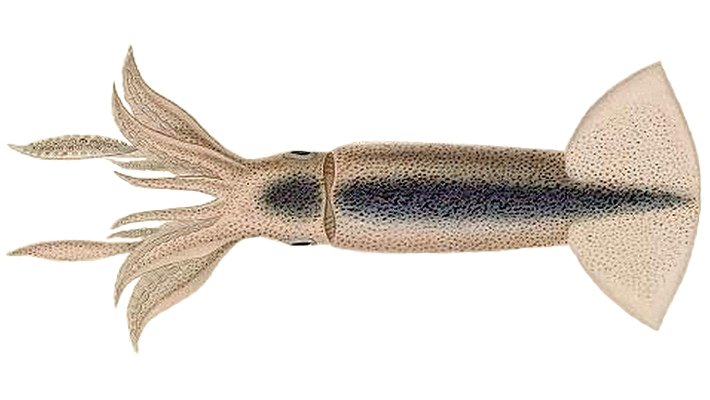

Conservation status
- Least Concern (IUCN 3.1)

Scientific classification
- Kingdom: Animalia
- Phylum: Mollusca
- Class: Cephalopoda
- Order: Oegopsida
- Family: Ommastrephidae
- Genus: Sthenoteuthis
- Species: S. oualaniensis

Binomial name
- Sthenoteuthis oualaniensis (Lesson, 1830)

Synonyms
- Loligo brevitentaculata Quoy & Gaimard, 1832; Loligo oualaniensis Lesson, 1830; Loligo vanikoriensis Quoy & Gaimard, 1832; Symplectoteuthis oualaniensis (Lesson, 1830)

= Sthenoteuthis oualaniensis =

Species of squid

The purpleback flying squid or purpleback squid (Sthenoteuthis oualaniensis) is a species of cephalopod in the family Ommastrephidae, occurring in the Indo-Pacific. It is considered one of the most abundant large squids.

== Description ==
S. oualaniensis are sexually dimorphic where the females tend to grow larger than the males in most cases. Dimorphism differentiation occurs in the sucker ring dentition in which different sizes occur which suggests that a feeding spectrum occurs among male and female individuals.

The species has a complex population structure, comprising three major and two minor forms with different morphology, anatomy, geographical distribution, and period of spawning. These forms include a giant form, a medium form with a double lateral axis on the gladius, a medium form with a single lateral axis on the gladius, a dwarf form, and a smaller earlier maturing form. The medium form is characterized by a dorsal photophore patch and fused mantle locking apparatus, it is the most common or “typical” form, and has the largest geographical distribution divide with a deeper vertical distribution when compared to the dwarf form. The dorsal mantle length (ML) of sexually mature adult males and females is 120 – 150 mm and 190 – 250 mm respectively. The smaller forms include a dwarf from an early maturing form, these two forms can be classified under the same category due to significant similarities as there is some disagreement in the literature. The smaller forms have no dorsal photophore patches and tend to reside in the equatorial waters (10 – 15 º N and S) of the Indonesian-Pacific Oceans, in which it spends the majority of its life in the upper mixed layers. The ML in the adult's males and females is 90 – 100 mm and 90 – 120 mm respectively. The giant forms are categorized by a dorsal photophore with a single lateral axis on the gladius and fused locking apparatus its distribution includes the Red Sea, the Arabian Sea and the Gulf of Aden northward of approximate 12 º N, to our knowledge a few mature adult females were recorded in the equatorial region of having an ML of 725 and 820 mm, whereas in the Arabian Sea an adult female had an ML of 300 – 500 mm. The different size forms can be explained by phenotypic plasticity due to environmental conditions.

== Distribution and habitat ==
Sthenoteuthis oualaniensis occurs in a diverse range of environments in the tropical and subtropical Indo-Pacific, often at depths of over 600 m (1,969 ft) deep, though they ascend to 20–25 m (66–82 ft) at night. Total species biomass has been estimated at between 8-11 million tonnes; the Arabian Sea from November–January is thought to contain one of the highest concentrations (12 to 42 t km^{−2}) of these squids due to population dynamics.

In October 2020, during a seafloor mapping survey in a then-unexplored area of the Gulf of Aqaba in the Northern Red Sea Region, a team of oceanographers and other scientists with OceanX encountered a lone specimen of S. oualaniensis with their remotely-operated underwater vehicle (ROV); while investigating the sunken remains of the Egyptian cargo ship "Pella", which sunk in 2011 (with one reported fatality), OceanX was able to capture clear, full-body images of the squid as it swam in front of the ROV.

== Feeding habits ==
Purpleback flying squids, which are thought to be both predators and prey, are considered both because throughout their life they are constantly changing, with continuous body-size increases allowing them to fulfill different trophic levels on the taxonomic and ecological spectrum in consideration of their food organisms, enemies and parasites. They feed utilizing a beak, which is a hard structure that contains composites of proteins and chitin fibres. Beaks are an important morphological characteristic; they can be used to identify and classify a species as they are easy to see with the naked eye and do not break down in the stomachs of predators. This feeding organ tears up and bites food, and throughout the squid's life, the characteristics of a beak can change as a result of ontogenetic states. The wing of the beak undergoes pigmentation that is related to the stiffness or hardness of the beak; the more tanned regions are harder than the untanned regions, and this pigmentation is directly linked with growth and changes in the diet.

Purpleback flying squids are highly active predators that can move through the water at high speeds, easily manoeuvre and respond swiftly to changes in their environment. When under distress from external factors such as predation, they can reach a high speed and glide above the surface over ten meters; the cruising speed of an adult squid is between 3 and 10 km per hour, whereas their burst speed can reach 35 km per hour. Burst speed can be important for sudden changes in movement and escape behaviour. They can gather into shoals ranging in size from two to 800 individuals, and in some cases in which geographical distributions overlap, they can travel within similar-sized schools of Dosidicus gigas and Ommastrephes bartramii.

The diet of purpleback flying squids depends on their mantle length; young squids or paralarva tend to feed predominately on mesozooplankton and mesozooplankton, which include copepods, amphipods and many others. Juveniles or post-paralarvae can feed on mesoplanktonic and macroplanktonic invertebrates, which mainly include copepods, euphausiids, amphipods and chaetognaths, as well as micronekton fishes (mainly myctophids) and squids, as their mantle length cane range between 10 and 80 mm. As they grow larger, their preference shifts toward larger fishes and squids and even other purpleback flying squids, as cannibalism is fairly common in this species.

== Predators ==
Purpleback flying squids are predated upon by many species throughout their life as they increase in size. Paralarvae and juveniles are usually eaten by larger animals that include chaetognaths, jellyfishes, small squids, planktivorous and small carnivores teleosts. Juveniles that have a mantle lengths of 3 to 12 mm are preyed on by large Humboldt squids Dosidicus gigas, dolphinfishes Coryphaena hippurus, C. equisetis, the snake mackerel Gempylus serpens, the lancet fish Alepisaurus ferox and many species of tuna. Many species of sea birds also predate on juvenile and smaller squids in oceanic regional islands. The predators of the medium- to large-sized purpleback squids include swordfishes Xiphias gladis, striped marlins Tetrapterus audax, many species of different sharks (for instance, the blue shark Prionace glauca), the dusky shark Carcharhinus obscurus, the oceanic whitetip shark Carcharhinus logimanus, the silky shark Carcharhinus falciformis, the smooth hammerhead shark Sphyrna zyganea, the sperm whale Physeter macrocephalus and the Galapagos fur seal Arctocephalus galapagoensis.

== Reproduction ==
Purpleback squids are thought to have a lifespan of up to one year, but the lifespan of much larger squids is unknown. The purpleback squid's spawning method is characteristic of the subfamily Ommastrephinae. S. oualaniensis is a monocyclic r-strategist, and the potential fecundity is dependent on the form type of the squid, which can range from 0.3 to 22 million.

The purpleback squid exhibits no premating rituals, as its overall mating system tends to be polygynous to polyandrous. Mating occurs in the surface waters at night where the squids mate in the “male-parallel” or the “head-to-head” positions to increase the likelihood of successful mating. The overall duration of mating is short, lasting up to two minutes. Successful copulations can produce up to 150 spermatangia, which are then attached to the buccal cone and the membrane of the females. Specific to this species are year-round spawning periods that can last up to three months for female squids. The peak season is also dependent on the form type of the squid. Spawning takes place near the epipelagic zone at night, while spawning occurs in intervals (up to 10 cycles) rather than in continuous time, and multiple batches can occur within one spawning period.

After spawning is completed, the large, pelagic, gelatinous egg masses will float to the surface above the upper pycnocline layer./ The females will remain to feed and grow while the remaining oocytes are matured and the next spawning interval begins. The duration of embryonic development is dependent on water temperature. For example, if development occurs at a water temperature of 25 °C, it takes approximately three to six days. The egg size can range from 0.75 to 0.9 mm, and the hatchling size has a mantle length of approximately 1.0 mm.

Purpleback squids are among the fastest-growing squid species, as the daily increase of overall length in the dwarf and middle-sized forms is about 1.0 mm; for the giant form, it is about 3.8 mm.

When embryonic development is complete, it is characterized by a paralarval stage that is unique to octopuses and squids. The paralarva is also known as the rhynchoteuthion stage, which is identified by the tentacles fusing to form a trunk-like proboscis with a few suckers on the distal tip. When this stage is completed, it is signified by a separation of approximately 7.0 to 8.0 mm in mantle length.
