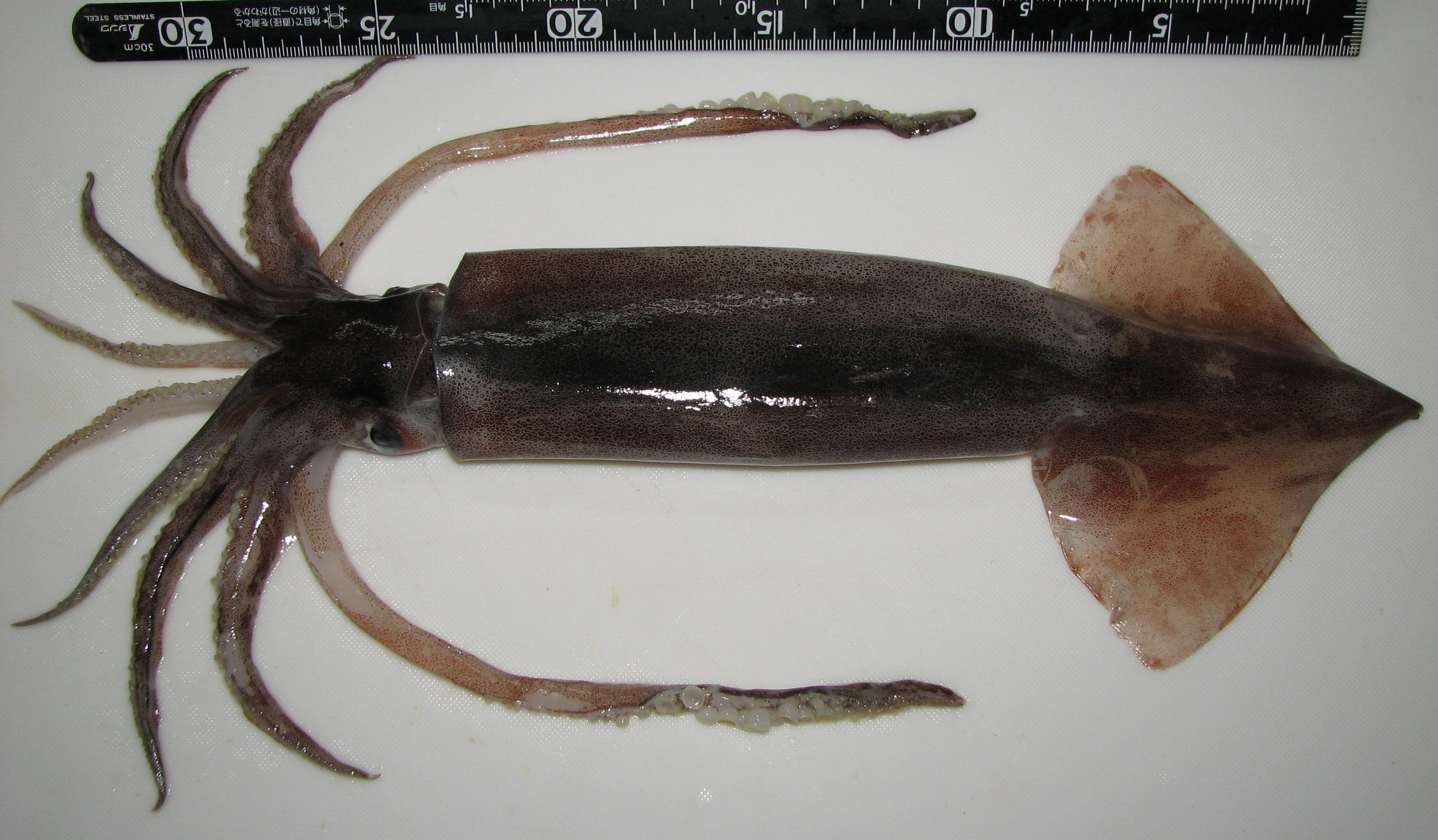
- Todarodes pacificus (dorsal view)

Conservation status
- Least Concern (IUCN 3.1)

Scientific classification
- Kingdom: Animalia
- Phylum: Mollusca
- Class: Cephalopoda
- Order: Oegopsida
- Family: Ommastrephidae
- Genus: Todarodes
- Species: T. pacificus

Binomial name
- Todarodes pacificus (Steenstrup, 1880)

Synonyms
- Ommastrephes pacificus Steenstrup, 1880; Ommastrephes sloani pacificus Sasaki, 1929; Todarodes sloanei pacificus (Steenstrup, 1880)

= Japanese flying squid =

Species of squid

The Japanese flying squid, Japanese common squid or Pacific flying squid (Todarodes pacificus) is a squid of the family Ommastrephidae. This animal lives in the northern Pacific Ocean, in the area surrounding Japan, along the entire coast of China up to Russia, then spreading across the Bering Strait east towards the southern coast of Alaska and Canada. They tend to cluster around the central region of Vietnam.

== Description ==
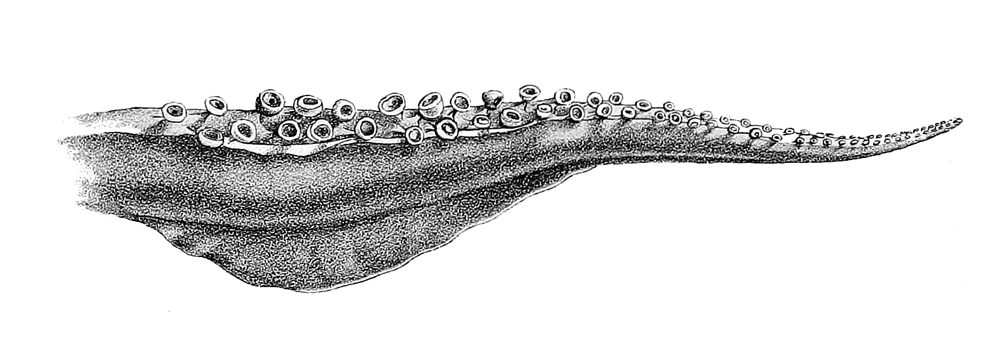
One of the eight arms

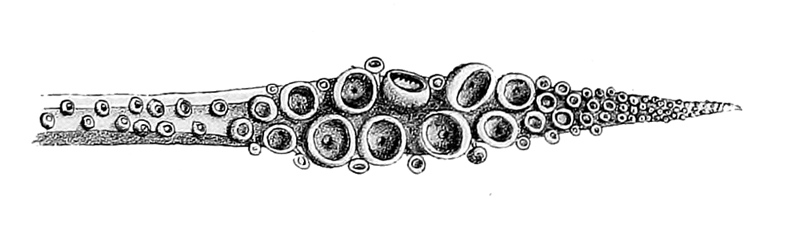
One of the two tentacular clubs

Adult Japanese flying squids have several distinguishing features. The mantle encloses the visceral mass of the squid, and has two fins, which are not the primary method of propulsion. Instead, the squid has a siphon, a muscle which takes in water from one side, and pushes it out the other side: jet propulsion. The squid has eight arms and two tentacles with suction cups along the underside. In between the arms sits the beak, which houses a toothed, tongue-like appendage called the radula. Squids have ink sacs, which they use as a defense mechanism against possible predators. Squids also have three hearts.

The age of a squid can be determined on the basis of growth rings when additions are appended daily to the statoliths, balance organs in the back of the squid's head. This species of squid can weigh up to 0.5 kg. Mantle length in females can go up to 50 cm; males are smaller.

== Habitat ==
The Japanese squid can live in water from 5 to 27 °C, and tend to inhabit the upper layers of the ocean. They are short-lived, only surviving about a year. The flying squid live in surface water of 100 m, but can go as deep as 500 m.

== Life cycle ==
Within this year of life, the squid mature from their larval form, feed and grow, migrate, and at the end of their lives, congregate at the mating grounds, where they reproduce. Three subpopulations have been identified in Japanese waters. "The main group spawns in winter in the East China Sea, the second in autumn, west of Kyushu, and the third, minor group in spring/summer in the Sea of Japan as well as off northeastern Japan."

"Their migration moves north, then south, tending to follow the surface currents. The squid tend to travel in large schools of more or less uniform size [meaning] that it is often possible to follow the growth of cohorts from recruitment to spawning, although the earliest part of the life history is generally more difficult to study because the larvae are always pelagic and some are rarely caught".

Squid generally only live one year because as soon as they reproduce, they die. Males mature first, and "transfer their spermatophores on the still immature females." Then, on the continuing journey south, the females "mature and spawn 300 to 4,000 small, elliptical or semi-spherical eggs." The squid migrate together and lay all their eggs in the same area where they were born. The eggs hatch into larvae after only 102–113 hours (somewhere around five days), depending on the water temperature.

== Diet ==
Squid are difficult to study individually in the lab, because "the animals appear to become stressed by isolation". However, the planktonic larvae are believed to feed on phytoplankton and zooplankton until they grow large enough to begin feeding on fish. When the squid mature more, they will eat mainly fish and crustaceans, but will also resort to cannibalism, especially when trapped in nets together.

== "Flying" ==
Flying squids of the family Ommastrephidae have been observed to cover distances as long as 30 m above the surface of the water, presumably to avoid predators or save energy as they migrate across vast expanses of ocean, uniquely utilizing jet-propelled aerial locomotion. Whether this exact species could glide in the air, however, is questionable, as it lacks the specialized extended membrane on its arms to produce lift while in the air, such as those seen in the genus Sthenoteuthis.

== Predators ==
Many vertebrate predators depend heavily on squid, which is second only to krill as a food source in the Southern Ocean. Animals such as the grey-headed albatross and the sperm whale (the largest of the toothed whales) feed almost entirely on squid. Other predators include dolphins, seals, baleen whales, and rays.

== Fishery ==
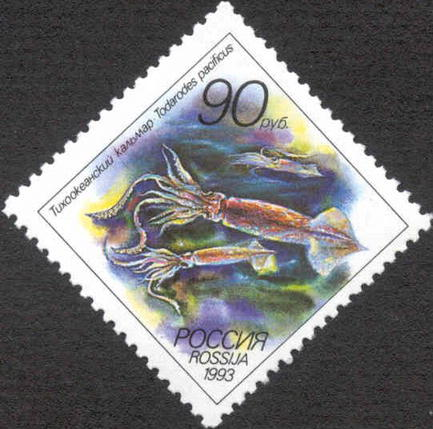
Japanese flying squid on 1993 Russia postal stamp.

Global capture production of Japanese flying squid (Todarodes pacificus) in thousand tonnes from 1950 to 2022, as reported by the FAO

Major fishers of the Japanese flying squid are mainly Japan (with the highest usage and catch in tons), the Republic of Korea (South Korea) (with the second-greatest catch), and relatively recently, China. Within all countries where it is being fished, the squid is also exported to many other countries for consumption, with the United States being a top importer. Japan is the largest consumer (mainly due to sushi) and exporter of the Japanese flying squid. (See also surume)

Japanese flying squid are caught all year round, but the largest and most popular seasons are from January to March, and again from June to September. Gear used to catch them is mainly line and hook, lift nets, and gill nets, the most popular method being hook and line used in jigging.

Current data on the Japanese flying squid show that, throughout the years, the rate of capture has fluctuated, with capture increasing and decreasing from the 1970s to the 1990s. Since 2010, catches have ranged from 570,427 tonnes in 2010 to 351,229 tonnes in 2012.

The fishing techniques used, mainly the hook-and-line methods, coupled with fishing at night to attract the squid, seem to allow for minimal by-catch. Other systems, such as gill nets, are usually less specific in what they catch, although some technological advances have involved larger openings to allow smaller animals to pass through.
