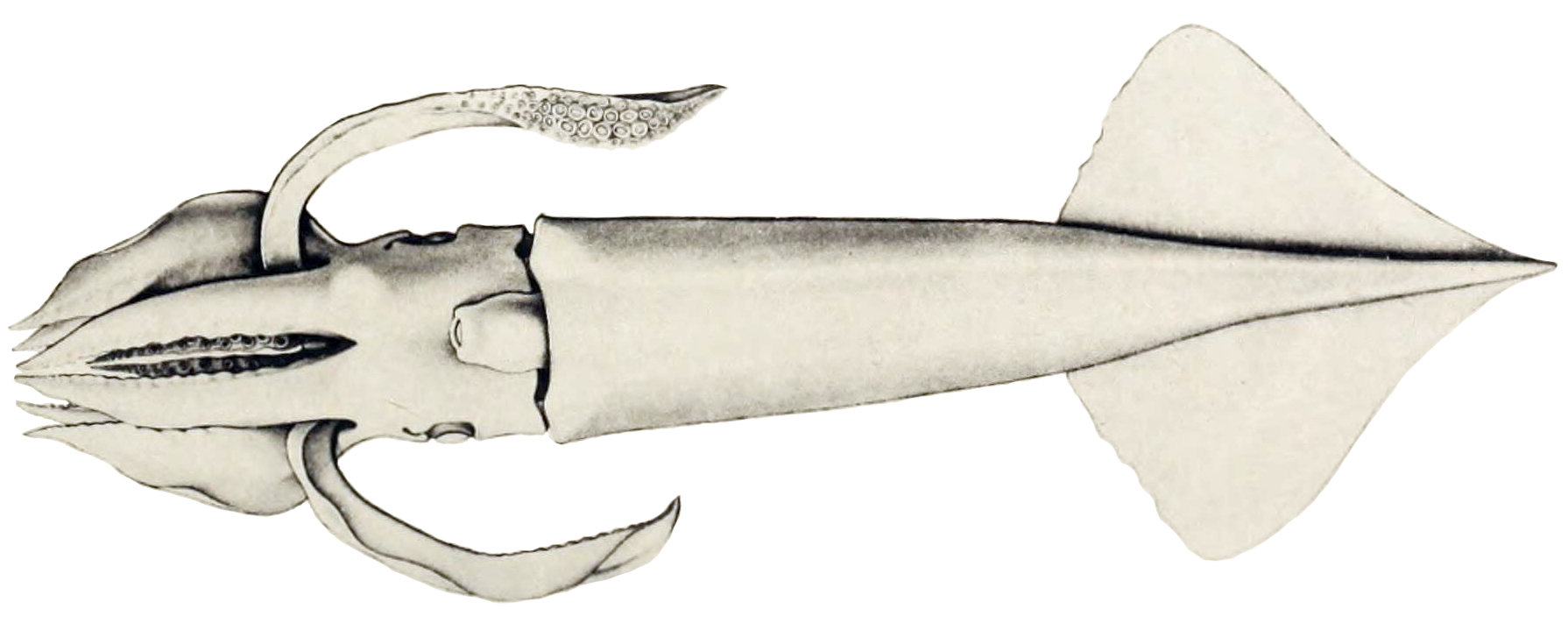
- Eucleoteuthis luminosa

Conservation status
- Least Concern (IUCN 3.1)

Scientific classification
- Kingdom: Animalia
- Phylum: Mollusca
- Class: Cephalopoda
- Order: Oegopsida
- Family: Ommastrephidae
- Subfamily: Ommastrephinae
- Genus: Eucleoteuthis; Berry, 1916
- Species: E. luminosa

Binomial name
- Eucleoteuthis luminosa (Sasaki, 1915)

Synonyms
- Symplectoteuthis luminosa Sasaki, 1915

= Striped flying squid =

Striped flying squid Temporal range: Pliocene - recent

Species of squid

Eucleoteuthis is a monotypic genus of squid from the family Ommastrephidae; the only species is Eucleoteuthis luminosa, the striped flying squid or luminous flying squid.

== Description ==
The striped flying squid is a very distinctive species which has two long, yellowish luminous stripes on the underside of its mantle surface and a fused apparatus for locking the funnel to the mantle. It grows to a mantle length of roughly 220 mm and the maximum mantle length recorded in males is 207 mm while the females are slightly longer at 227 mm. Its fourth left arm is hectocotylized and has 19–22 suckers in two series in its basal two-thirds where there is a weak protective membrane and there are two pointed knobs rather than suckers on its tip where the ventral protective membrane is more developed than that on the dorsal side. The largest suckers on the tentacular clubs have either a smooth margin or a single large tooth. The smaller suckers may have more teeth. The apparatus for locking the funnel organ to the mantel is forked towards the front and is fused to the rear, but only in individuals who have a mantle length over 9 mm. There are small subcutaneous photophores on the underside of mantle, head and of the third and fourth arms, while the fourth arms have a large oval photophore at their bases and another hallway to their tips. The ventral surface of mantle has two stripes of luminous tissue extending along almost its entire length with two large, oval-shaped luminous patches at the end of each mantle strip closest to the head. The fins are heart-shaped and taper to a point. The larvae have dispersed large brown chromatophores while in the juveniles these are crimson and brown.

The species is bioluminescent.

== Distribution ==
The striped flying squid is distributed in the southern oceans and in the North Pacific Ocean but it is absent from the North Atlantic Ocean. In the southern South Pacific it occurs between 20°S and 35°S in the west and it is found from 13°S to 43°S in the east; in the southern Indian Ocean it occurs north to 15°S and south to 34°S and in the southern South Atlantic Ocean between 10°S and 36°S. In the North Pacific Ocean it occurs from the southern Kuril Islands to western North America as far south as Mexico, between 10°N to 40°N.

== Habitat and biology ==
The striped flying squid is found in the epipelagic and upper mesopelagic zones, occurring from near the surface to a depth of 400 m. It lives in open waters mostly over depths of over 200 metres (660 ft), and it appears to be nektonic rather than benthic. Subadults and adults have been recorded at the surface at night, but only rarely. They spend the day at depths greater than 50 to 100 metres (330 ft). They are low to moderately abundant; they are most numerous in the South Pacific Ocean between 30°S and 40°S. Males reach maturity at 95 to 185 mm mantle length, normally at age 180 to 270 days, and females mature at 102 to 200 mm mantle length when they are aged 220 to 240 days. This varies widely over the squid's range and they grow larger at lower latitudes. The maximum lifespan is one year. In the lower latitudes they spawn throughout the year but in the higher latitudes it is restricted to the spring and summer. The male's spermatophores are 11.2 to 15.8 mm in length, in the Needham's sac of mature males there may be up to 150 of them although more usually between 70 and 100 are present. The egg size is 0.8 to 1.0 mm, and each female may have between 300,000 and 625,000 ova, with the oviducts of mature females holding about 17 000 ripe eggs, probably more.
