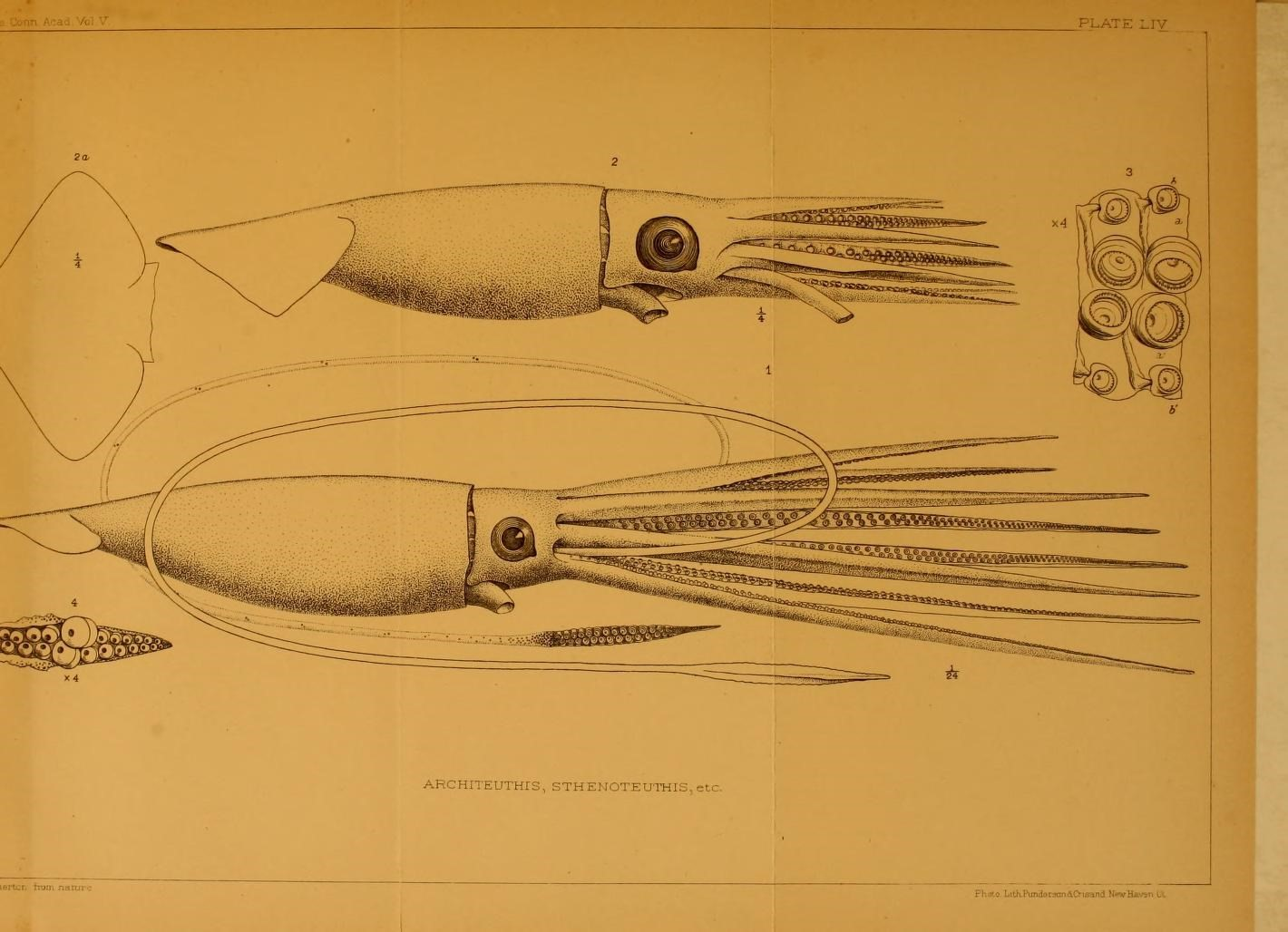

Scientific classification
- Kingdom: Animalia
- Phylum: Mollusca
- Class: Cephalopoda
- Order: Oegopsida
- Family: Ommastrephidae
- Subfamily: Ommastrephinae
- Genus: Sthenoteuthis; Verill, 1880

Type species
- Architeuthis megaptera Verrill, 1878

= Sthenoteuthis =

Genus of squids

Sthenoteuthis is a genus of small squids, with two species, part of the subfamily Ommastrephinae within the family Ommastrephidae, the "flying squids". They are the dominant species of flying squid in the world's tropical and subtropical seas and they are commonly seen at the ocean's surface during the night. Mantle lengths of 100–600 mm (3.9–23.6 in).

== Species ==
There are two species in the genus Sthenoteuthis:

- Sthenoteuthis oualaniensis (Purpleback flying squid) (Lesson, 1830)
- Sthenoteuthis pteropus (Orangeback flying squid) (Steenstrup, 1855)
