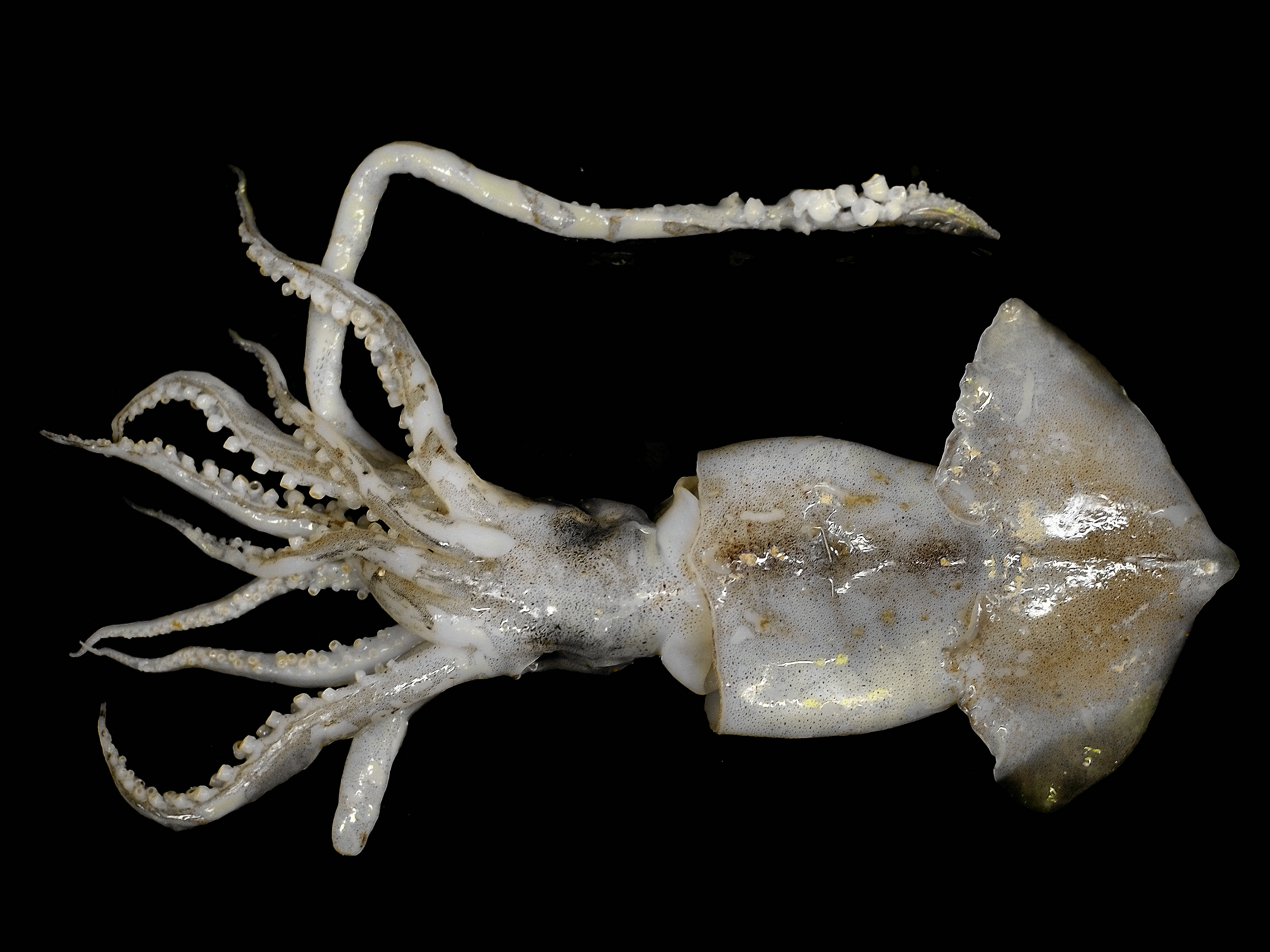
- Lesser flying squid (Todaropsis eblanae)

Scientific classification
- Kingdom: Animalia
- Phylum: Mollusca
- Class: Cephalopoda
- Order: Oegopsida
- Superfamily: Cranchioidea
- Family: Ommastrephidae; Steenstrup, 1857

Subfamilies
- Illicinae; Ommastrephinae; Todarodinae...and see text

= Ommastrephidae =

Ommastrephidae Temporal range: Pliocene - recent

Family of squids

Ommastrephidae is a family of squid containing three subfamilies, 11 genera, and over 20 species. They are widely distributed globally and are extensively fished for food. One species, Todarodes pacificus, comprised around half of the world's cephalopod catch annually.

Some members of Ommastrephidae are known for their jet-propelled flight, earning them the common name of "flying squid".

== Description ==
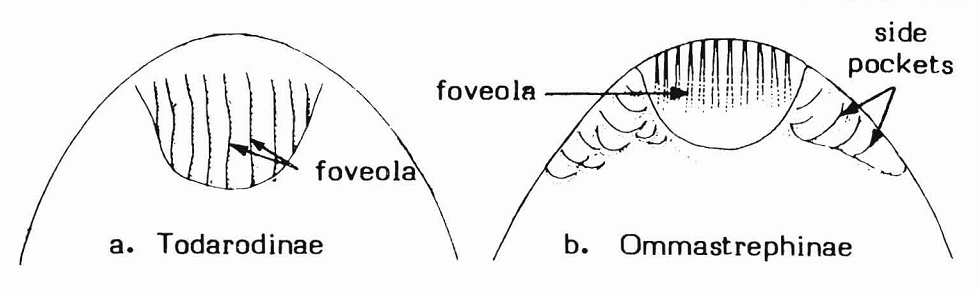
Funnel grooves of ommastrephid subfamilies

The ommastrephids are small to large squids, with mantle lengths ranging from that of the glass squid (Hyaloteuthis pelagica) at 9 cm (3.5 in), to the Humboldt squid (Dosidicus gigas) at 1.5 m (4.9 ft). The mantle narrows towards the back and possesses large terminal fins. The family is characterized by an inverted T-shaped funnel locking cartilage. They have an easily recognizable, slender, feather-shaped gladius with a hollow cone structure (the primary conus). Light organs (photophores) are present along the head and mantle of members of the subfamily Ommastrephinae.

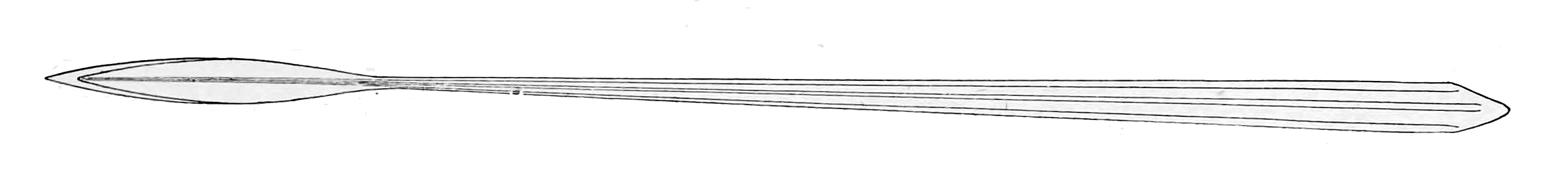
The gladius of Illex illecebrosus

Ommastrephid arms have a double series of suckers. The enlarged tips (the clubs) of the tentacles have four rows of suckers, except in the genus Illex, which has eight. Hooks are absent. One of the ventral arms develops into a secondary sexual organ (the hectocotylus) in males.

All ommastrephids are active predators. Their arms and tentacles bear sharp teeth and are used to grasp and bring prey to their beaked mouths. They are very strong swimmers, and some species are known to glide out of water to escape predators.

Ommastrephid paralarvae are distinctive for having fused tentacles, looking like a single "proboscis". It gradually splits into two as the paralarvae grow becoming completely separated once they reach mantle lengths of 5 to 10 mm (0.20 to 0.39 in).

== Distribution and habitat ==
Ommastrephids usually occur in pelagic waters, but can also be found in neritic habitats. They are found worldwide.

== Taxonomy ==
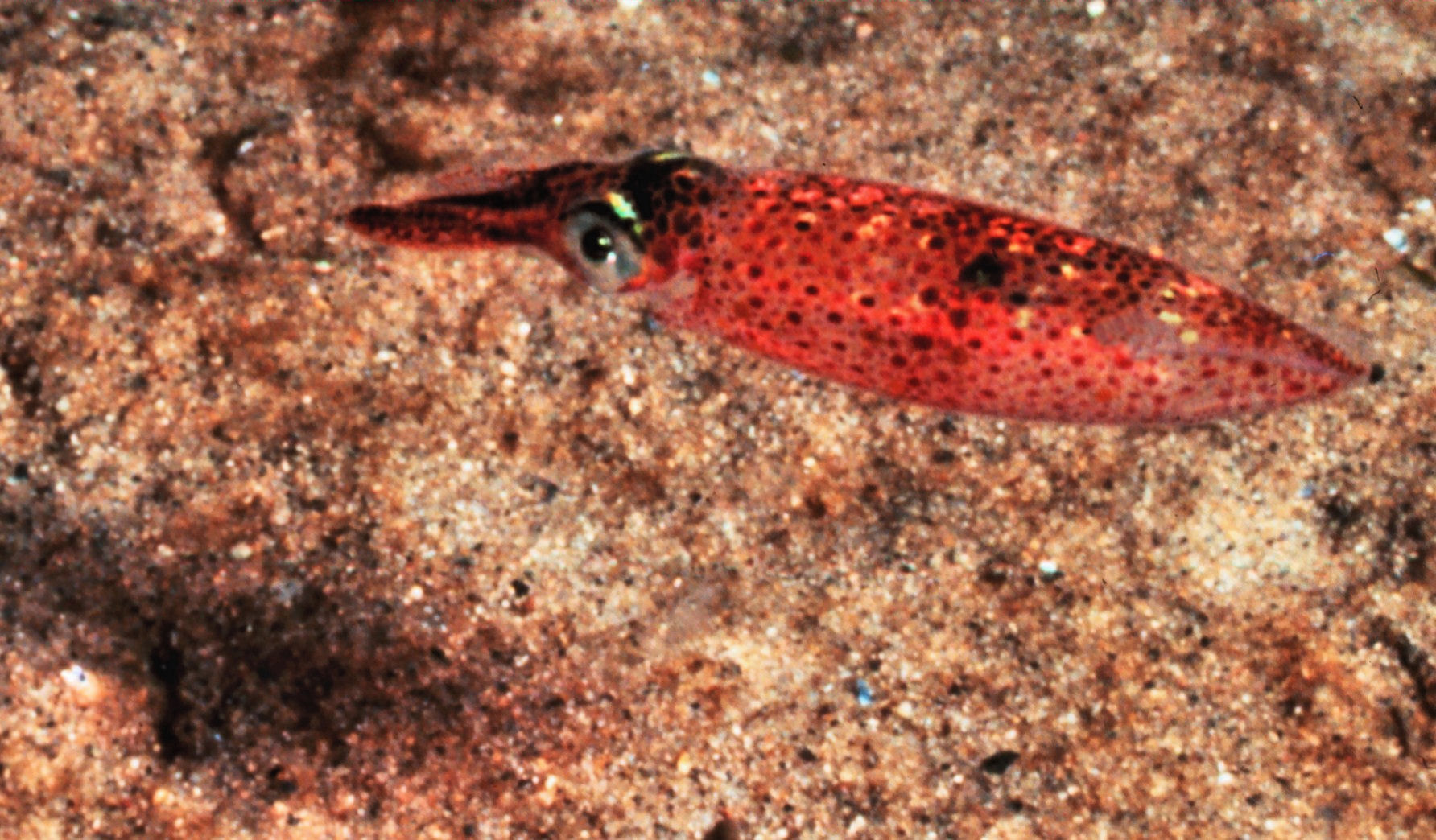
Northern shortfin squid (Illex illecebrosus)

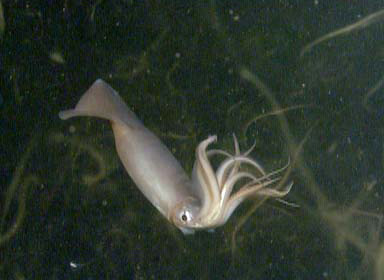
Humboldt squid (Dosidicus gigas)

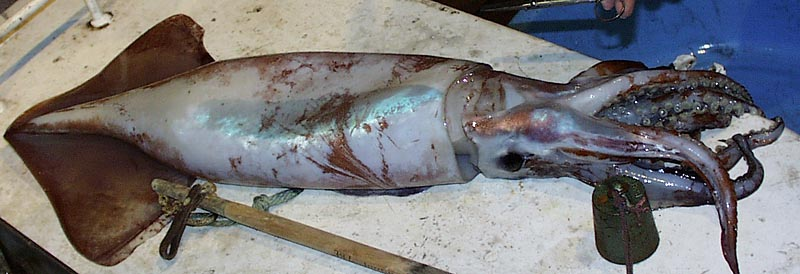
Neon flying squid (Ommastrephes bartramii)

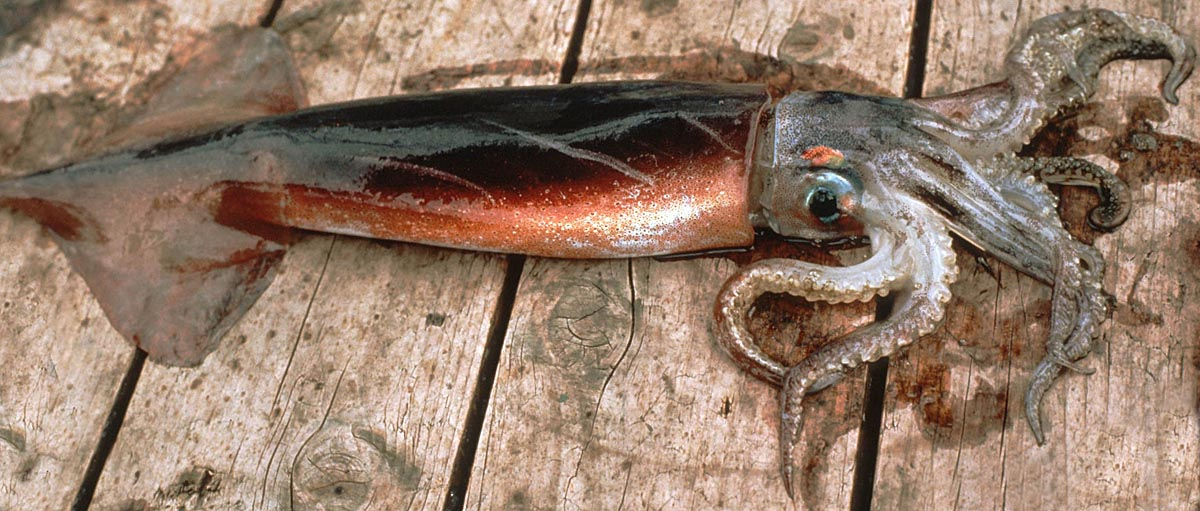
Sevenstar flying squid (Martialia hyadesii)

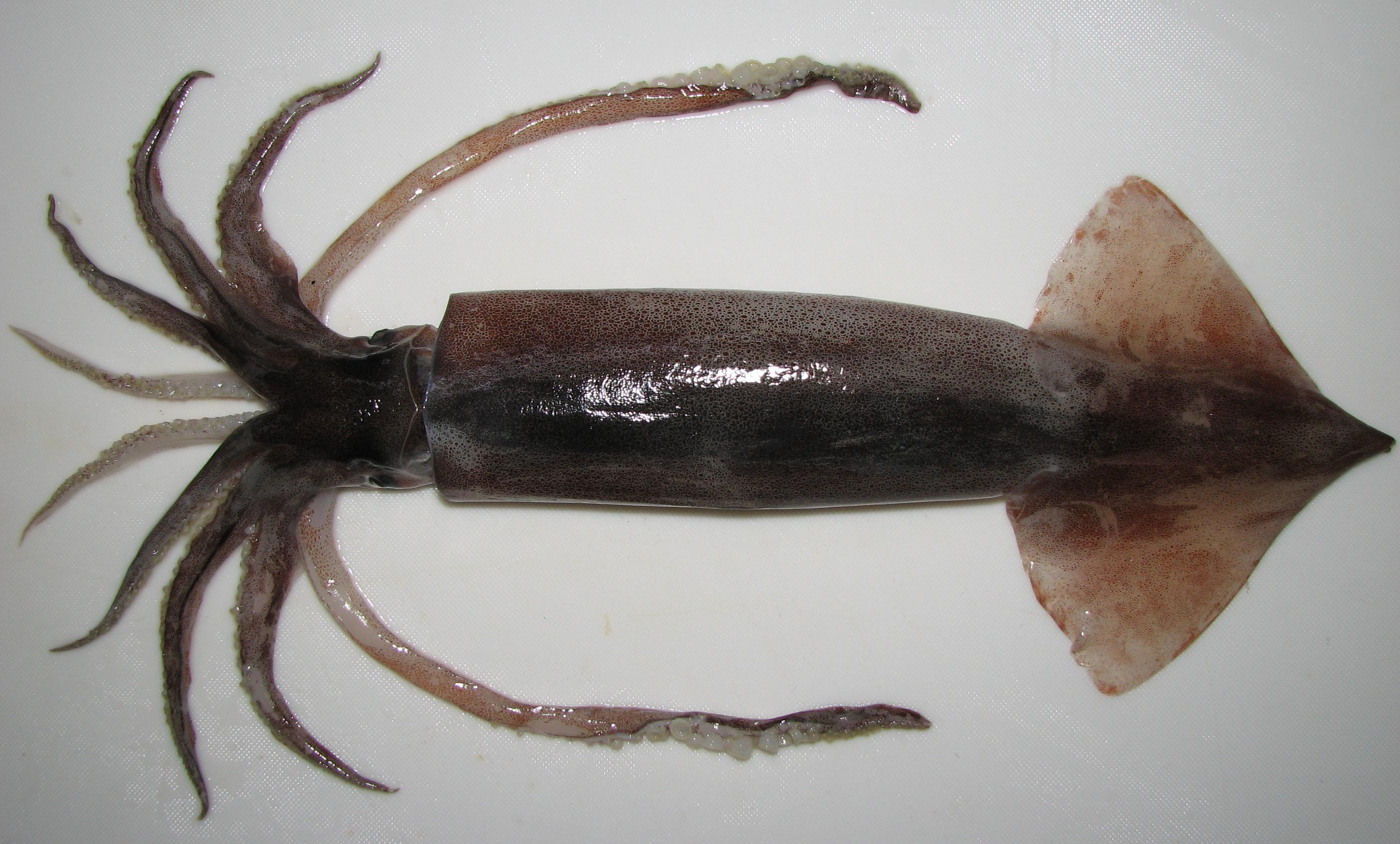
Japanese flying squid (Todarodes pacificus)

Ommastrephidae was first established by the Danish zoologist Japetus Steenstrup in 1857. It is classified under the suborder Oegopsina of the order Teuthida (squids). It is divided into five subfamilies which are further subdivided into 11 genera and more than 20 species.

The following subfamilies, genera, and species are classified in the family Ommastrephidae:

- Family Ommastrephidae

- Subfamily Illicinae

- Genus Illex

- Illex argentinus, Argentine shortfin squid
- Illex coindetii, southern shortfin squid
- Illex illecebrosus, northern shortfin squid
- Illex oxygonius, sharptail shortfin squid

- Subfamily Ommastrephinae

- Genus Dosidicus

- Dosidicus gigas, Humboldt squid, jumbo flying squid or jumbo squid

- Genus Eucleoteuthis

- Eucleoteuthis luminosa, striped squid or luminous flying squid

- Genus Hyaloteuthis

- Hyaloteuthis pelagica, glassy flying squid

- Genus Ommastrephes

- Ommastrephes bartramii, neon flying squid or red flying squid
- Ommastrephes brevimanus
- Ommastrephes caroli
- Ommastrephes cylindraceus

- Genus Sthenoteuthis

- Sthenoteuthis oualaniensis, purpleback squid or purpleback flying squid
- Sthenoteuthis pteropus, orangeback squid or orangeback flying squid

- Subfamily Ornithoteuthinae

- Genus Ornithoteuthis

- Ornithoteuthis antillarum, Atlantic bird squid
- Ornithoteuthis volatilis, shiny bird squid

- Subfamily Todarodinae

- Genus Martialia

- Martialia hyadesii, sevenstar flying squid

- Genus Nototodarus

- Nototodarus gouldi, Gould's flying squid
- Nototodarus hawaiiensis, Hawaiian flying squid
- Nototodarus sloanii, Wellington flying squid or New Zealand arrow squid

- Genus Todarodes

- Todarodes angolensis, Angola flying squid
- Todarodes filippovae, Antarctic flying squid
- Todarodes pacificus, Japanese flying squid or Japanese common squid
- Todarodes pusillus, little flying squid
- Todarodes sagittatus, European flying squid

Subfamily Todaropsinae

- Genus Todaropsis

- Todaropsis eblanae, lesser flying squid

== See also ==
- Loliginidae
