= Christian Vaupell =

Danish botanist and forester (1821–1862)

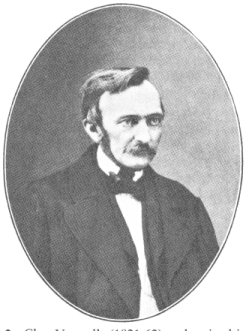
Christian Vaupell

Christian Theodor Vaupell (14 October 1821 – 15 September 1862) was a Danish botanist and forester. He was a student of Japetus Steenstrup and a teacher of botany at the University of Copenhagen to the young Eugen Warming.

Vaupell did macrofossil analysis of peat deposits and showed that in the Holocene development of temperate forest communities in Denmark, Betula was the chief early pioneer, followed by Pinus and Quercus and finally Fagus, which dominates today. These investigations pioneered the study of ecological succession. Besides studies of Holocene vegetation change and plant successions, Vaupell did pioneering investigations of palaeoecology as well as microscopy of plant anatomy and vegetative reproduction.

== Selected works ==
Vaupell, C. (1851) De nordsjællandske Skovmoser. En botanisk-mikroskopisk Undersøgelse af de Plantedele, som danne Tørven og af de Levninger af Fortidens Skove, der ere bevarede i nogle nordsjællandske Skovmoser (Wooded Bogs in Northern Zealand - a botanical-microscopic investigation of the plant parts that make up the peat and of the remains of past forests that are preserved in some wooded bogs in northern Zealand).

Vaupell, C. (1857) Bøgens Indvandring i de Danske Skove (Immigration of the Beech into the Danish Forests). C. A. Reitzels Bo og Arvinger, Kjøbenhavn, 63 pp.

Vaupell, C. (1858) De l’invasion du hêtre dans les forèts du Danemark. Annales des Sciences Naturelles Bot., 4. Series, 7, 55–86.

Vaupell, C. (1863) De danske Skove (The Danish Forests). P. G. Philipsens Forlag, Kjøbenhavn, 309 pp. Foreword by G. Ploug.
