= William Gilly =

William Frank Gilly is an American biologist specializing in the study of cephalopods. He works at Gilly Lab, Hopkins Marine Station, in Monterey County, as a professor of biology, at Stanford University and was involved with the television special The Future is Wild.

== Early life ==
Gilly received a BSE (Electrical Engineering, 1972) from Princeton University and a Ph.D. (Physiology and Biophysics, 1978) from Washington University in St. Louis. He had additional training at Yale University, University of Pennsylvania and the Marine Biological Laboratory at Woods Hole.

== Career ==
From the late 1970s to the 2010s, he contributed to the basic understanding of electrical excitability in nerve and muscle cells in a wide range of organisms ranging from brittle-stars to mammals. Much of this work employed the giant axon system of the squid as an experimental model system for molecular and biophysical approaches. Additional physiological studies made in the living squid revealed unexpected complexities in how the giant axon system controls escape responses, and how mechanisms governing that control are subject to modification by environmental factors like temperature and during normal development.

=== Humboldt squid ===
Gilly's current research program on squid concentrates on the behavior and physiology of Dosidicus gigas, the jumbo or Humboldt squid. Fieldwork in the Gulf of California near Santa Rosalía, Baja California Sur and off Monterey Bay employs a variety of tagging methodologies in order to track short-term diel vertical migrations as well as long-distance migrations.

== Recognition ==
Gilly was nominated by Stanford University to be one of the USA Science and Engineering Festival's Nifty Fifty Speakers who spoke about his work and career to middle and high school students in October 2010. He is also an adviser to the Microbes Mind Forum.

== Personal life ==
Gilly is a fan of John Steinbeck, Ed Ricketts, Robinson Jeffers and other notable characters in the Monterey peninsula.
