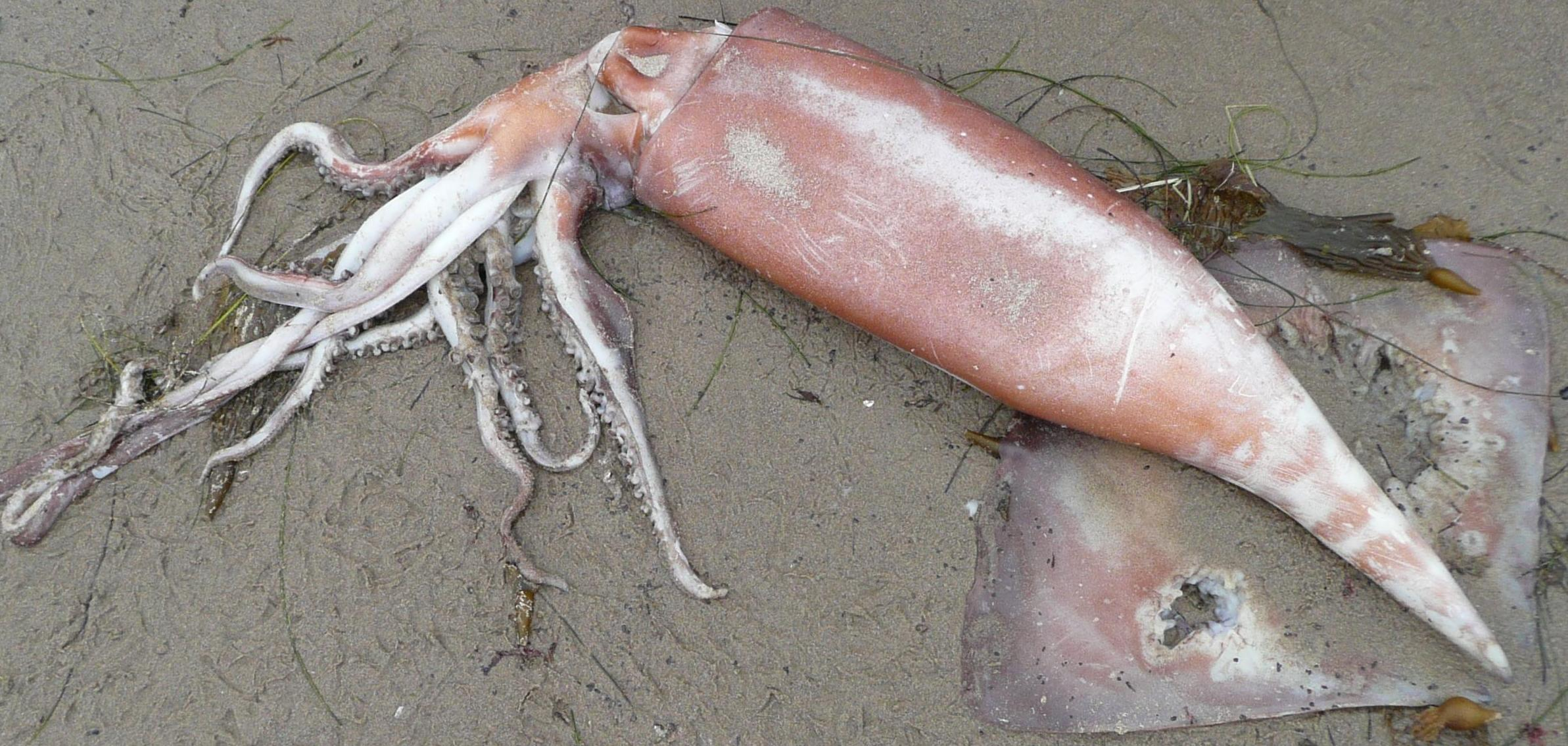
- A Humboldt squid (Dosidicus gigas) that washed up on a Santa Barbara shoreline

Scientific classification
- Kingdom: Animalia
- Phylum: Mollusca
- Class: Cephalopoda
- Order: Oegopsida
- Family: Ommastrephidae
- Subfamily: Ommastrephinae; Posselt, 1891

Type genus
- Ommastrephes d'Orbigny, 1834

= Ommastrephinae =

Ommastrephinae Temporal range: Pliocene - recent

Subfamily of squids

Ommastrephinae is a subfamily of squids under the family Ommastrephidae.

== Description ==
Ommastrephinae includes the largest species of squids belonging to the family Ommastrephidae, Humboldt squid (Dosidicus gigas) which can grow to 1.5 metres (4.9 ft) in mantle length (ML). It also contains the smallest squid species belonging to the family, the glass squid (Hyaloteuthis pelagica) which has a mantle length of only up to 9 cm (3.5 in). Ommastrephinae are mostly pelagic members of the family Ommastrephidae. Some species of the subfamily (notably Sthenoteuthis and Ommastrephes) are known for their behavior of leaping out of the water (hence the common name 'flying squid').

== Taxonomy ==
The name of the subfamily, like the family itself and the type genus Ommastrephes, comes from Greek ὄμμα ('eye') and -strephes ('rolling'). They were first described by H.J. Posselt in 1891.

=== List of genera ===
Nine species of squids are recognized in the subfamily Ommastrephinae, divided among five genera:

- Genus Dosidicus
  - Dosidicus gigas, Humboldt squid, jumbo flying squid or jumbo squid
- Genus Eucleoteuthis
  - Eucleoteuthis luminosa, striped squid or luminous flying squid
- Genus Hyaloteuthis
  - Hyaloteuthis pelagica, glass squid or glassy flying squid
- Genus Ommastrephes
  - Ommastrephes bartramii, neon flying squid or red flying squid
  - Ommastrephes brevimanus
  - Ommastrephes caroli
  - Ommastrephes cylindraceus
- Genus Sthenoteuthis
  - Sthenoteuthis oualaniensis, purpleback squid or purpleback flying squid
  - Sthenoteuthis pteropus, orangeback squid or orangeback flying squid
