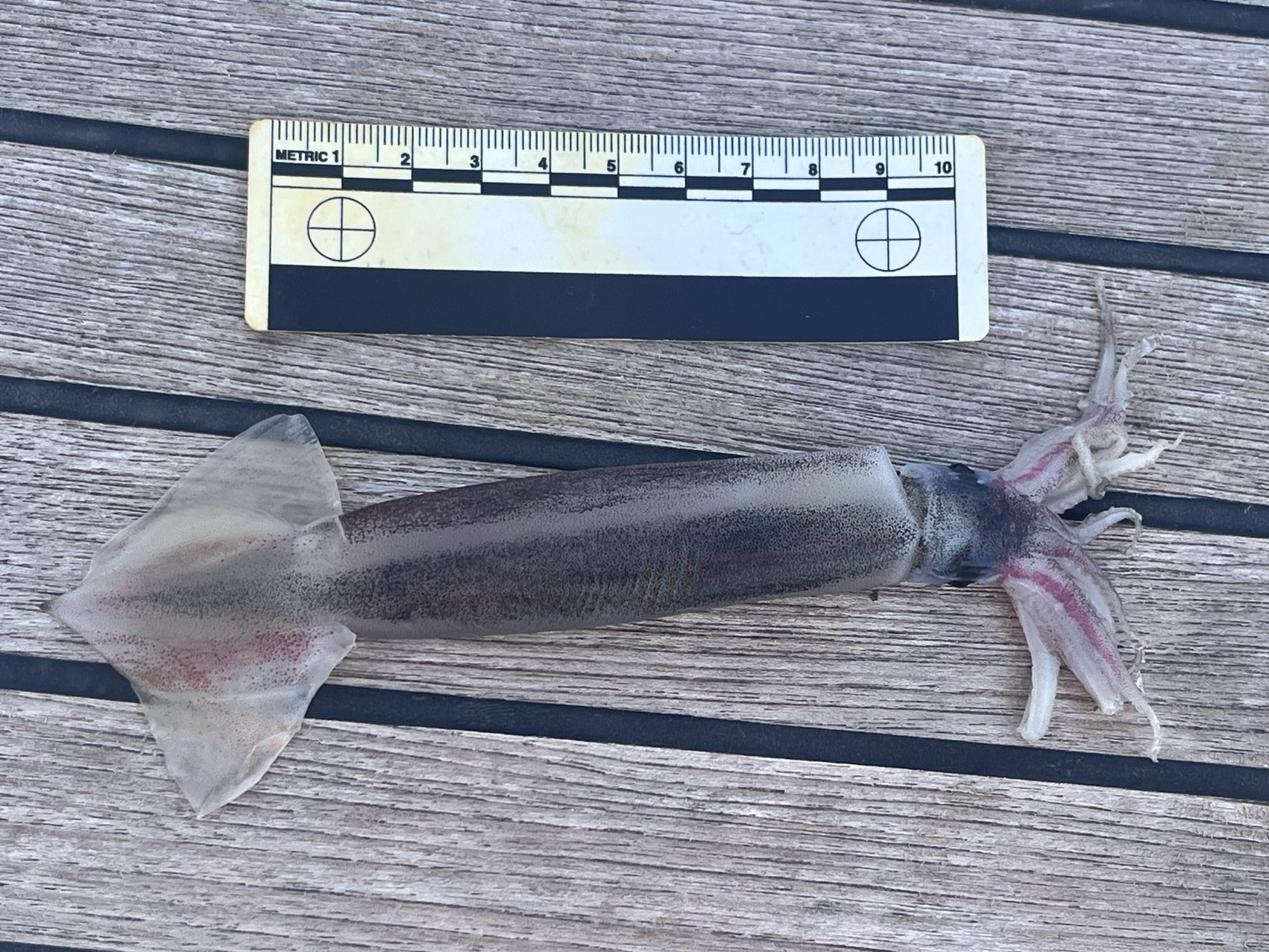
- Ommastrephes caroli

Scientific classification
- Domain: Eukaryota
- Kingdom: Animalia
- Phylum: Mollusca
- Class: Cephalopoda
- Order: Oegopsida
- Family: Ommastrephidae
- Subfamily: Ommastrephinae
- Genus: Ommastrephes; A. d'Orbigny, 1835

Synonyms
- Cycria Leach, 1849; Lolimnites Risso, 1854; Ommatostrephes Lovén, 1845

= Ommastrephes =

Genus of squids

Ommastrephes is a widespread genus of squid in the family Ommastrephidae.

== Species ==
There are four species recognised in the genus Ommastrephes:

- Ommastrephes bartramii (Lesueur, 1821)
- Ommastrephes brevimanus (A. Gould, 1852)
- Ommastrephes caroli (Furtado, 1887)
- Ommastrephes cylindraceus (A. d'Orbigny, 1835)
