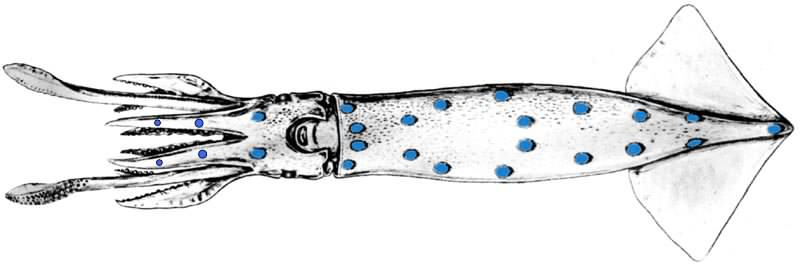

Conservation status
- Least Concern (IUCN 3.1)

Scientific classification
- Kingdom: Animalia
- Phylum: Mollusca
- Class: Cephalopoda
- Order: Oegopsida
- Family: Ommastrephidae
- Subfamily: Ommastrephinae
- Genus: Hyaloteuthis; Gray, 1849
- Species: H. pelagica

Binomial name
- Hyaloteuthis pelagica (Bosc, 1802)

= Hyaloteuthis =

Genus of squids

Hyaloteuthis is a genus of squids in the family Ommastrephidae. It is monotypic, being represented by the single species, Hyaloteuthis pelagica, also known as the glassy flying squid or glass squid. The glassy flying squid grows up to 9 cm (3.5 in) in length and is bioluminescent.
