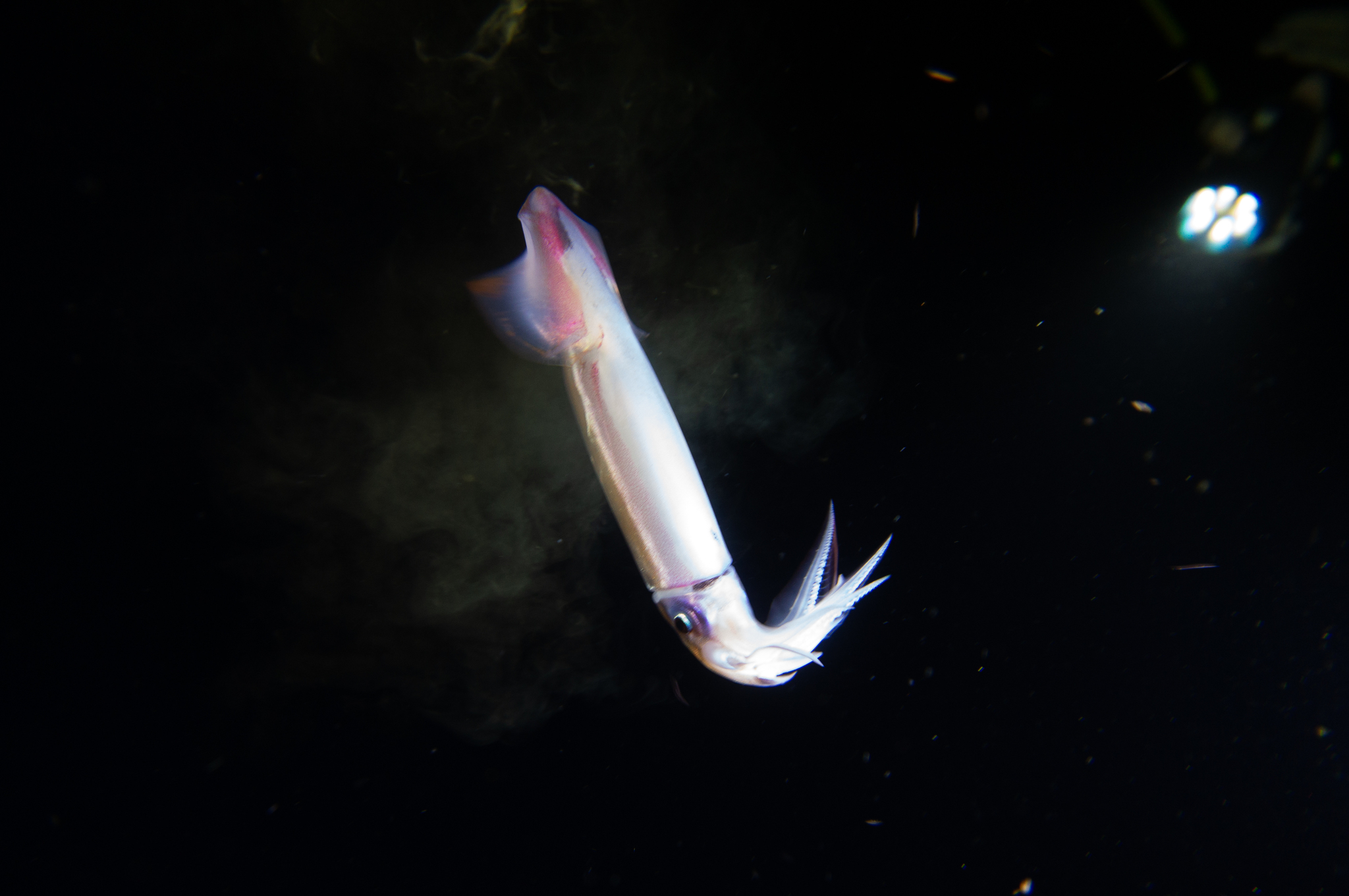
- An adult neon flying squid in the ʻAlenuihāhā Channel, Hawaii.

Conservation status
- Least Concern (IUCN 3.1)

Scientific classification
- Kingdom: Animalia
- Phylum: Mollusca
- Class: Cephalopoda
- Order: Oegopsida
- Family: Ommastrephidae
- Genus: Ommastrephes
- Species: O. bartramii

Binomial name
- Ommastrephes bartramii (Lesueur, 1821)

Synonyms
- Species synonymy: Loligo bartramii Lesueur, 1821; Loligo pironneauii Souleyet, 1852; Loligo touchardii Souleyet, 1852; Loligo vitreus Rang, 1835 in Férussac & D'Orbigny, 1834-1848; Ommastrephes caroli Furtado, 1887; Ommastrephes caroli stenobrachium Rancurel, 1976; Ommastrephes caroli stenodactyla Rancurel, 1976; Ommastrephes cylindraceus d'Orbigny, 1835 in 1834–1847; Ommatostrephes caroli Furtado, 1887; Onychoteuthis brevimanus Gould, 1852; Stenoteuthis bartrami (Lesueur, 1821); Sthenoteuthis bartramii (Lesueur, 1821)

= Neon flying squid =

Species of squid

The neon flying squid (Ommastrephes bartramii), sometimes called the red flying squid, akaika, and red squid is a species of large flying squid in the family Ommastrephidae. They are found in subtropical and temperate oceanic waters globally.

The genus contains bioluminescent species.

== Taxonomy ==
Ommastrephes bartramii belongs to the family Ommastrephidae, subfamily Ommastrephinae. It was first described by the French naturalist, explorer, and artist Charles Alexandre Lesueur in 1821. Russian taxonomists consider the separate spawning populations of Ommastrephes bartramii as subspecies. It was thought that Ommastrephes bartramii was the only species belonging to the monospecific genus Ommastrephes, but a 2020 study which used mitochondrial DNA to evaluate individuals across nearly the entire distributional range revealed that the genus is actually an allopatric cryptic species complex with four distinct species consistently identified. As a result of these results, in combination with morphological and metabolic information from the literature, three formerly synonymised names were resurrected: Ommastrephes brevimanus, Ommastrephes caroli, and Ommastrephes cylindraceus, and revised distributional ranges were proposed for each species.

== Description ==
Ommastrephes bartramii are easily distinguishable by the presence of an elongated silver-colored band in the middle of the ventral side of the mantle. Adult males usually have a mantle length of 29 to 32 cm (0.95 to 1.05 ft), but can reach the maximum length of 45 cm (1.48 ft). Adult females are much larger, usually having a mantle length of around 50 cm (1.6 ft), with the maximum known length being 60 cm (2.0 ft).

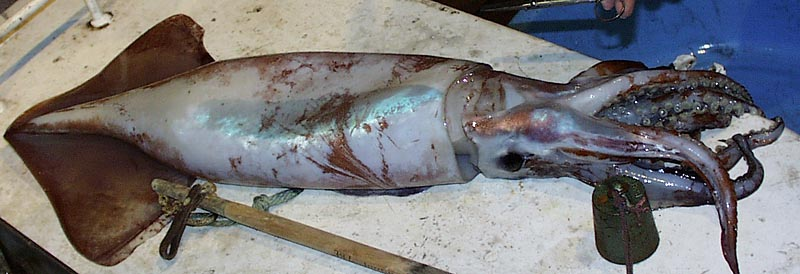
A freshly caught neon flying squid from Northern Hawaiian waters. The distinctive ventral silver band can be clearly seen. Photograph courtesy of Richard E. Young, Department of Oceanography, University of Hawaii and the Tree of Life Web Project.

Their arms do not possess lateral membranes and have 9 to 27 suckers on the ventral sucker series and 10 to 25 suckers on the dorsal sucker series. The left and right third arms have protective membranes greater in width than the arm width. The hectocotylus develops from the left or right fourth arm. Another distinguishing characteristic of O. bartramii is the presence of 4 to 7 toothed suckers on the tentacular club, near the nearest carpal suckers of the carpal locking apparatus. This is especially useful in differentiating it from the orangeback flying squid (Sthenoteuthis pteropus).

Photophores are present but are small, irregular, and restricted to the ventral side of the mantle, head, and tentacles. Visceral photophores are absent.

Like other ommastrephids and onychoteuthids known as 'flying squid', neon flying squid are so named for their ability to shoot out of the water, much like flying fishes. They sometimes unintentionally land on the decks of ships. This happens more frequently during rough weather or in the presence of predators in the vicinity, and it is presumed that this behavior is an instinctive response to threat. Flying squid have been observed to engage in behaviors that prolong the time it remains in the air, making it more akin to actual flight than just gliding. Biologists, however, still do not fully understand the exact mechanisms by which the squid become airborne. Nevertheless, the phenomenon is known to happen quite frequently and at least one photographic piece of evidence of Ommastrephes bartramii in flight exists.

== Distribution and habitat ==
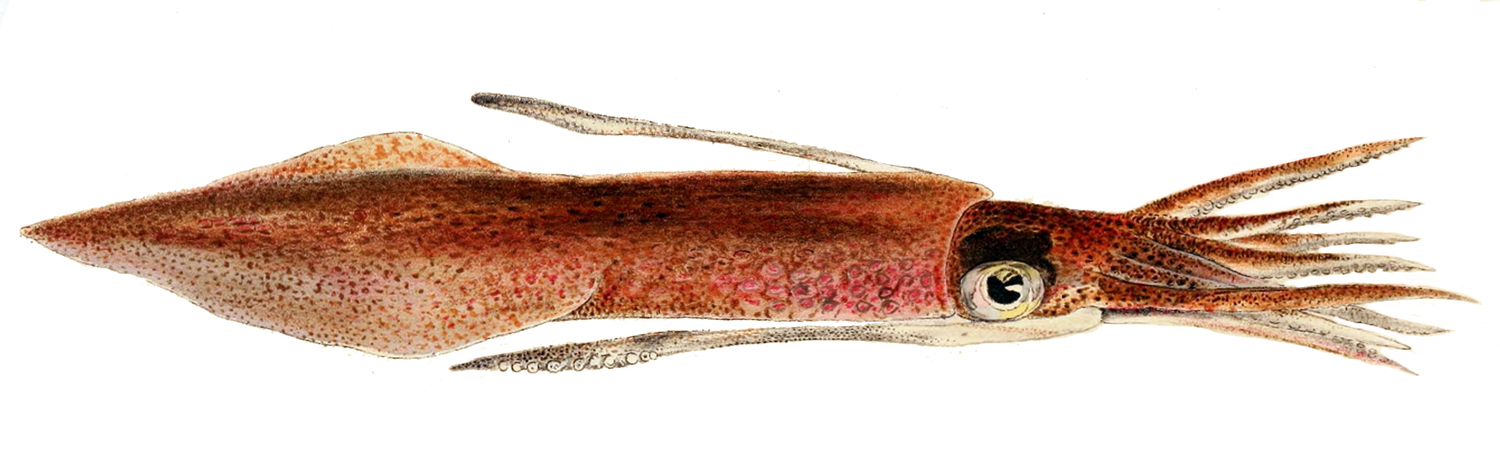
An illustration of Ommastrephes bartramii in the 1870 book Report on the Invertebrata of Massachusetts.

Neon flying squid are cosmopolitan, being found in subtropical and temperate waters of the Pacific, Atlantic, and Indian Oceans. They are rarely found in the Mediterranean.

At night, they are usually found feeding just beneath the surface near cold-water fronts, at depths of 0 to 70 m (0 to 230 ft). They descend to depths of 300 to 700 m (980 to 2,300 ft) during daytime, though they have been known to descend to depths of up to 1,490 m (4,890 ft). This movement pattern is known as diel vertical migration and is also exhibited by other oceanic organisms.

== Ecology and biology ==
=== Life cycle ===
Neon flying squid are highly migratory. They have a lifespan of about one year, during which they complete a cyclical migration between their feeding and spawning grounds. Mating occurs when males (who usually achieve sexual maturity earlier in the season) pass spermatophores to the females. The female squid store them in the oral surface of their buccal membrane until they too become sexually mature later in the season and begin to spawn. Spawning is continuous and not seasonal, occurring virtually throughout the year in intermittent spawning events. Each female spawns approximately 350,000 to 3.6 million eggs, depending on their size. Males and females are both presumed to die soon after. Hatchlings are around 1 mm (0.039 in) long and grow rapidly, reaching a length of 7 mm (0.28 in) after a month. The paralarvae migrate northwards toward the waters bordering subarctic regions during summer and autumn. They are usually found feeding at a depth of 25 m (82 ft) from the surface. Maturing squid return to the spawning grounds to mate.

=== Diet and predators ===
Neon flying squid eat small oceanic fishes (like lanternfishes and saury) and other squids. They are known to engage in cannibalism to smaller members of their own species as well. They serve as prey to large fishes (like swordfish, marlin, and tuna), sharks, and marine mammals. They are also fished commercially for human consumption.
