= Ommastrephes brevimanus =

Scientific classification
- Domain: Eukaryota
- Kingdom: Animalia
- Phylum: Mollusca
- Class: Cephalopoda
- Order: Oegopsida
- Family: Ommastrephidae
- Genus: Ommastrephes
- Species: O. brevimanus

Binomial name
- Ommastrephes brevimanus (Gould, 1852)

Synonyms
- Ommastrephes caroli stenodactyla Rancurel, 1976; Onychoteuthis brevimanus Gould, 1852

Species of flying squid

Ommastrephes brevimanus is a species of flying squid in the family Ommastrephinae native to the Kermadec Islands.
