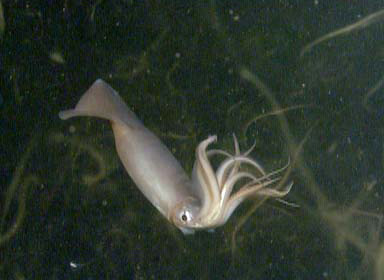
- A Humboldt squid swimming around ROV Tiburon, possibly attracted to its lights

Conservation status
- Data Deficient (IUCN 3.1)

Scientific classification
- Kingdom: Animalia
- Phylum: Mollusca
- Class: Cephalopoda
- Order: Oegopsida
- Family: Ommastrephidae
- Subfamily: Ommastrephinae
- Genus: Dosidicus; Steenstrup, 1857
- Species: D. gigas

Binomial name
- Dosidicus gigas (d'Orbigny, 1835)

Synonyms
- Ommastrephes gigas d'Orbigny, 1835; Ommastrephes giganteus Gray, 1849; Dosidicus eschrichti Steenstrup, 1857; Dosidicus steenstrupi Pfeffer, 1884

= Humboldt squid =

Humboldt squid Temporal range: Pliocene - recent

Species of cephalopod

The Humboldt squid (Dosidicus gigas), also known as the red devil, jumbo squid, or jumbo flying squid, is a large, predatory squid living in the eastern Pacific Ocean. It is the only known species of the genus Dosidicus of the subfamily Ommastrephinae, family Ommastrephidae.

Humboldt squid typically reach a mantle length of 1.5 m (5 ft), making the species the largest member of its family, and one of the largest species of squid. They are most commonly found at depths of 200 to 700 m (660 to 2,300 ft), from Tierra del Fuego to California. This species is currently spreading north into the waters of the Pacific Northwest, in Oregon, Washington, British Columbia, and Alaska. Like other members of the subfamily Ommastrephinae, they possess chromatophores which enable them to quickly change body coloration, known as 'metachrosis' which is the rapid flash of their skin from red to white. They have a relatively short lifespan of just 1–2 years.

This species is the most important squid worldwide for commercial fisheries, with the catch predominantly landed in Chile, Peru and Mexico; however, a 2015 warming waters fishery collapse in the Gulf of California remains unrecovered. They have a reputation for aggression toward humans, although this behavior may only occur during feeding times.

== Nomenclature ==
=== Common name ===
This species is most often known as jumbo squid in English, but has also been called jumbo flying squid or Humboldt squid, with the last name most popular in naturalist sources. The name Humboldt refers to the Humboldt Current, off the southwestern coast of South America, where it was first collected. A general name for this species in Spanish in Latin America is calamar gigante. Local names for it are jibia in Chile or pota in Peru. They notably rapidly flash red and white when captured, earning them the nickname diablo rojo (meaning 'red devil') among local fishermen in Baja California, Mexico.

=== Taxonomy ===
The existence of this creature was first reported to the scientific world by the Chilean priest and polymath Juan Ignacio Molina in 1782, who called it Sepia tunicata, Sepia being the type genus of cuttlefish. It was subsequently formally described as a species new to science by the French naturalist Alcide d'Orbigny, who named it Ommastrephes gigas in 1835, but an illustration was labeled Loligo gigas. Another French naturalist, Claude Gay, obtained some specimens from Chile and sent them to the Muséum national d'Histoire naturelle in Paris, where it was determined that the species did not belong in the genus Loligo either. In 1857 the Danish zoologist Japetus Steenstrup proposed the new genus Dosidicus to house the species, where it remains. The German zoologist George Pfeffer synonymized D. eschrichtii with D. gigas in 1912.

The fossil species Dosidicus lomita is represented by fossils of statoliths from the Pliocene Lomita Marl of California, marking the earliest known occurrence of the genus.

== Description ==
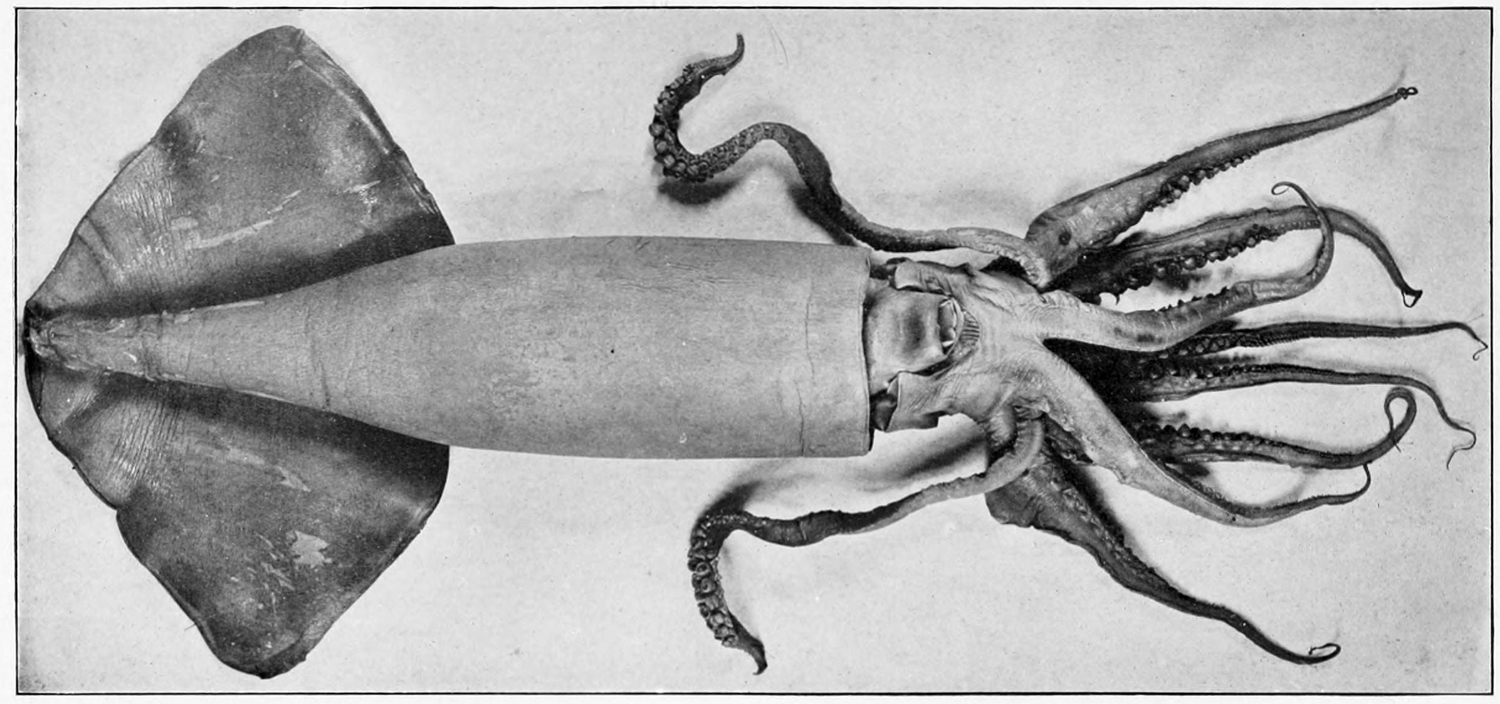
Ventral view of D. gigas from the Bulletin of the United States Fish Commission

The Humboldt squid is the largest of the Ommastrephid squids, as some individuals may grow to 1.5 m (5 ft) in mantle length and weigh up to 50 kg (110 lb). They appear to be sexually dimorphic: on average the females mature at larger sizes than the males. Generally, the mantle (or body, which includes the fins or wings) constitutes about 56–62% of the animal's mass, the arms and tentacles about 11–15%, the head (including eyes and beak) about 10–13%, the outer skin (cuticle) 2.5–5.0%, the hepatopancreas (liver analogue) 4.2–5.6%, with the rest made up of the other inner organs. The gonads consist of 1.5–15.0% of the total mass. The gladius (the single inner 'bone') is 0.7–1.0%. Precise ratios depend on the age, sex and sizes of the individual squid.

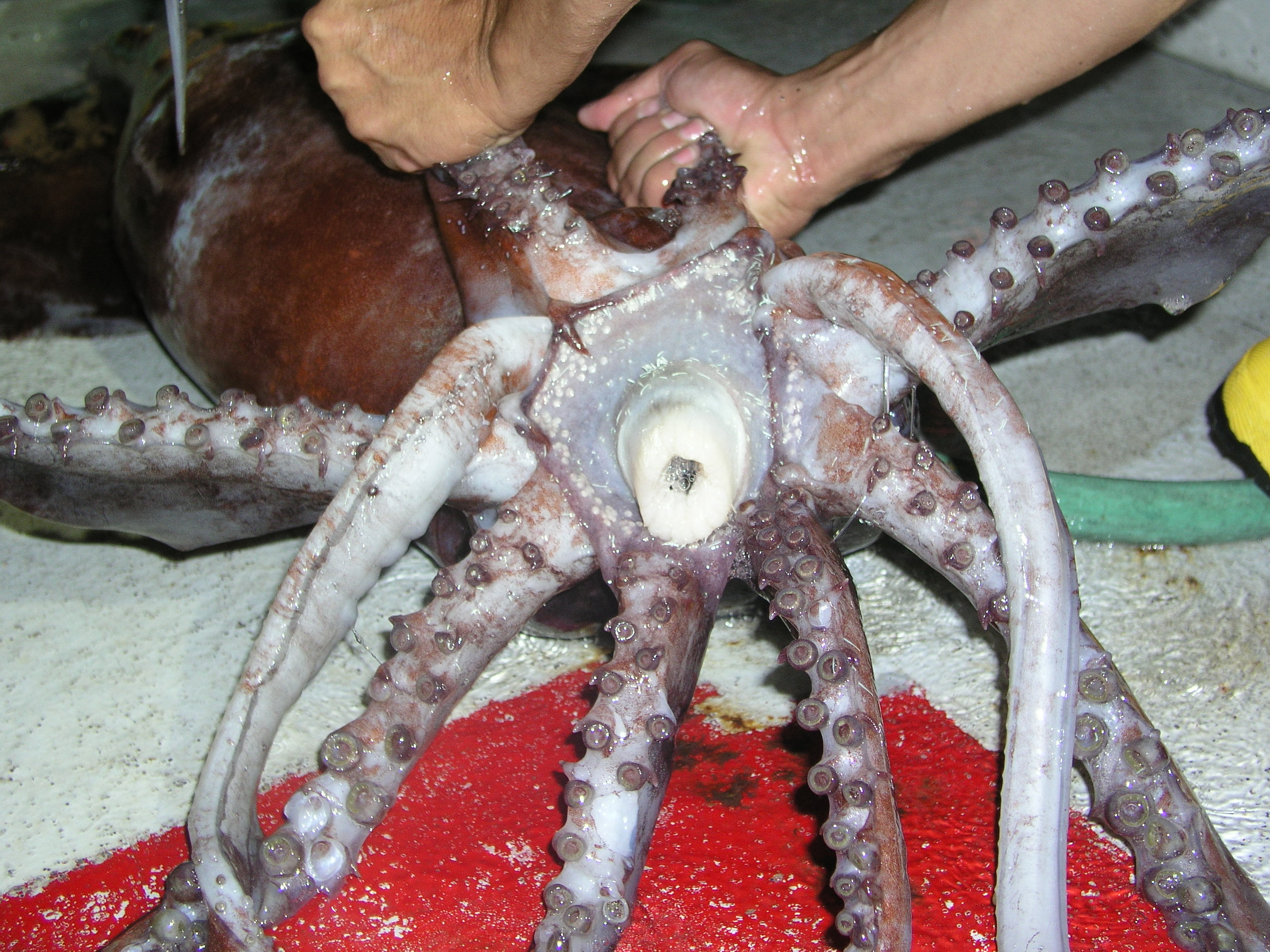
Live Humbolt squid tentacles and beak. Taken in the Sea of Cortez in 2006.

They are propelled by water ejected through a hyponome (siphon) and by two triangular fins. The Humboldt's two tentacles are elastic and can lash out with remarkable speed to grab hold of prey, holding it fast with the help of a wealth of suckers on each tentacle. Each sucker includes an inner ring of teeth. After grabbing the prey, the tentacles then retract and the prey is drawn toward a large, razor-sharp beak.

== Behavior ==
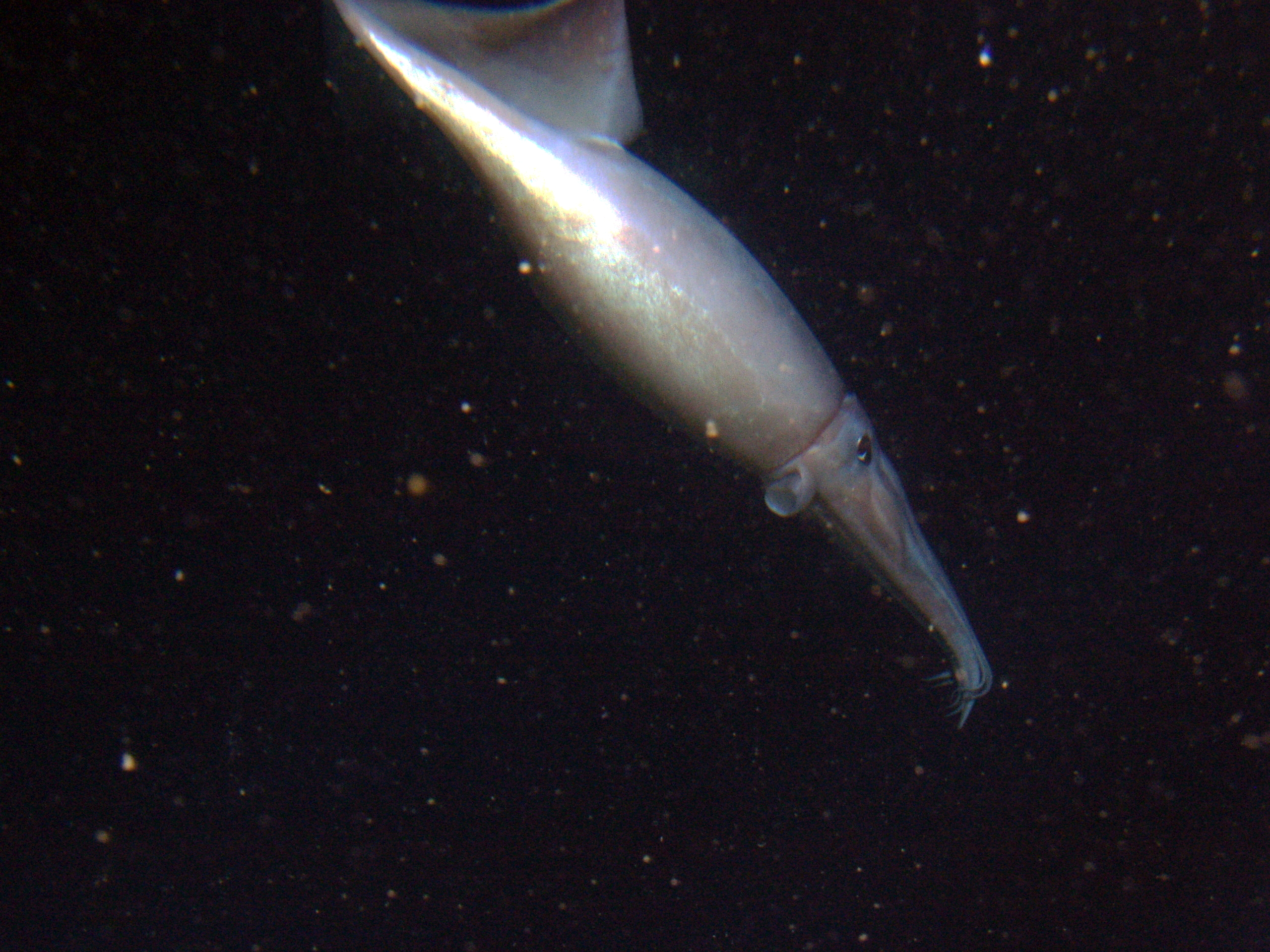
A Humboldt squid photographed at a depth of 250 m (820 ft) off California

Humboldt squid are carnivorous marine invertebrates that move in shoals of up to 1,200 individuals. They swim at speeds up to 24 km/h (15 mph; 13 kn).

Electronic tagging has shown Humboldt squid undergo diel vertical migrations, which bring them closer to the surface from dusk to dawn. Humboldt squid are thought to have a lifespan of about a year, although larger individuals may survive up to 2 years.

Crittercams attached to two or three Humboldt squid revealed the species has two modes of color-generating (chromogenic) behavior:

- The entire body flashes between the colors red and white at 2–4 Hz when in the presence of other squid, this behavior likely representing intraspecific signaling. This flashing can be modulated in frequency, amplitude and in phase synchronization with each other. What they are communicating to each other is unknown – it could be an invitation for sex or a warning to not get too close.
- The other chromogenic mode is a much slower "flickering" of red and white waves which travel up and down the body, this is thought to be a dynamic type of camouflage which mimics the undulating pattern of sunlight filtering through the water, like sunlight on the bottom of a swimming pool. The squid appear to be able to control this to some degree, pausing or stopping it.

Although these two chromogenic modes are not known in other squid species, other species do have functionally similar behaviors.

== Distribution and habitat ==
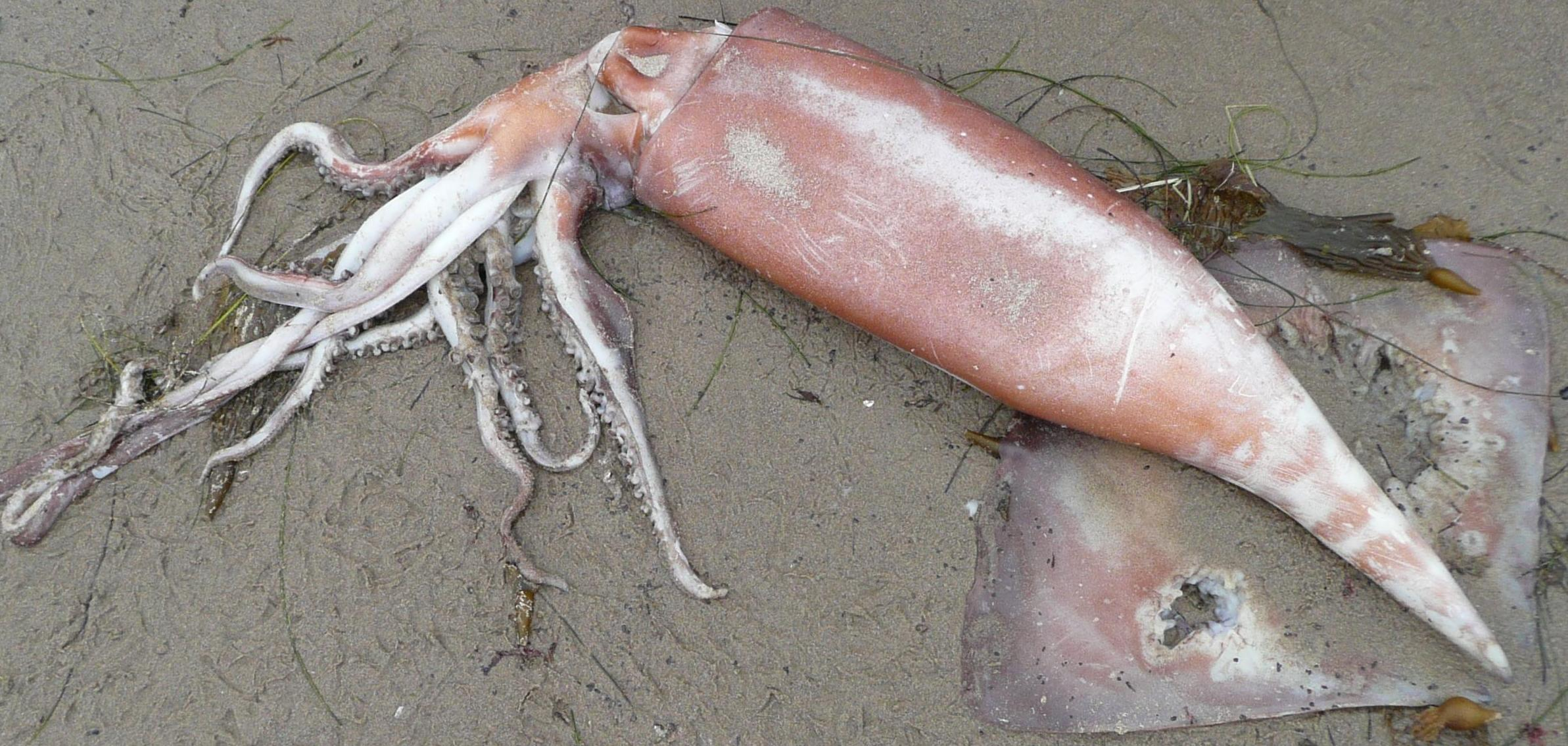
A Humboldt squid that washed up on a beach at Santa Barbara

The Humboldt squid lives at depths of 200 to 700 m (660 to 2,300 ft) in the eastern Pacific (Notably in Chile and Peru), ranging from Tierra del Fuego north to California. Recently, the squid have been found as far north as British Columbia. They have also ventured into Puget Sound.

Although they usually prefer deeper water, between 1,000 and 1,500 squid washed up on the Long Beach Peninsula in southwest Washington in late 2004 and red algae were a speculated cause for the late 2012 beaching of an unspecified number of juvenile squid (average length 50 cm or 1.5 ft) at Monterey Bay over a 2-month period.

=== Changes in distribution ===
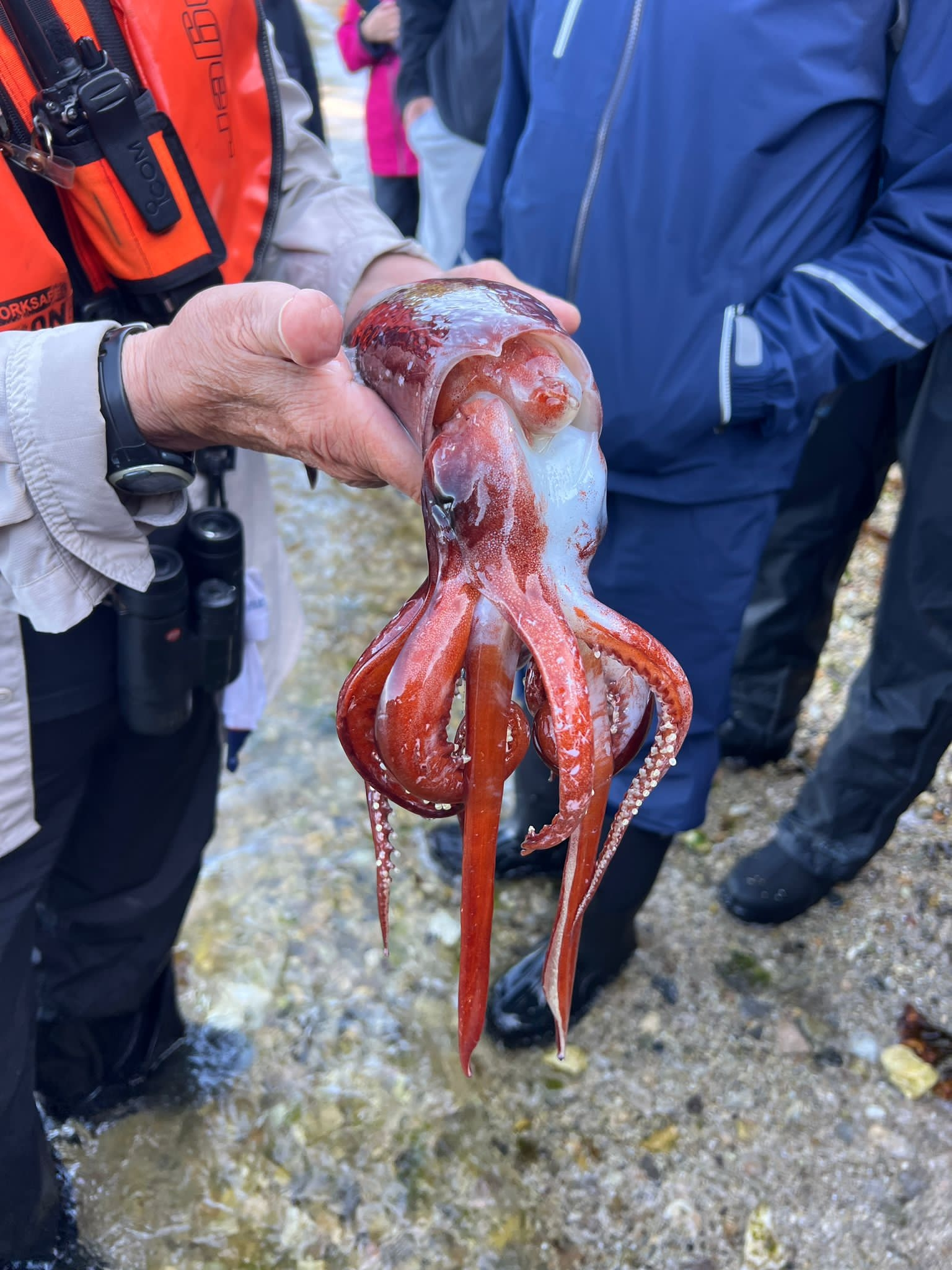
Humboldt squid washed up in Alaska

Humboldt squid are generally found in the warm Pacific waters off the Mexican coast; studies published in the early 2000s indicated an increase in northern migration. The large 1997–1998 El Niño event triggered the first sightings of Humboldt squid in Monterey Bay. Then, during the minor El Niño event of 2002, they returned to Monterey Bay in higher numbers and have been seen there year-round since then. Similar trends have been shown off the coasts of Washington, Oregon, and even Alaska, although no year-round Humboldt squid populations are in these locations. This change in migration is suggested to be due to warming waters during El Niño events, but other factors, such as a decrease in upper trophic level predators that would compete with the squid for food, could be impacting the migration shift, as well.

A 2017 Chinese study found that D. gigas is affected by El Niño events in the waters off Peru. The squid populations cluster into groups less, and are thus more dispersed, during El Niño events. Additionally, during warm El Niño conditions and high water temperature the waters off Peru were less favourable for D. gigas.

== Ecology ==
=== Prey and feeding behavior ===
The Humboldt squid's diet consists mainly of small fish (lanternfish, in particular), crustaceans, cephalopods (octopuses and other squid), and copepods. The squid uses its barbed tentacle suckers to grab its prey and slices and tears the victim's flesh with its beak and radula. They often approach prey quickly with all 10 appendages extended forward in a cone-like shape. Upon reaching striking distance, they open their eight swimming and grasping arms, and extend two long tentacles covered in sharp hooks, grabbing their prey and pulling it back toward a parrot-like beak, which can easily cause serious lacerations to human flesh. These two longer tentacles can reach full length, grab prey, and retract so fast that almost the entire event happens in one frame of a normal-speed video camera. Each of the squid's suckers is ringed with sharp teeth, and the beak can tear flesh, although they are believed to lack the jaw strength to crack heavy bone. The squid are known for their speed at eating; they feast on hooked fish, stripping them to the bone before fishermen can reel them in.

Their behavior while feeding often includes cannibalism and they have been seen to readily attack injured or vulnerable squid in their shoal. A quarter of squid stomachs analyzed contained remains of other Humboldt squid. This behavior may account for a large proportion of their rapid growth. An investigation of the stomach contents of over 2,000 squid caught outside of the Exclusive Economic Zone off the coasts of Chile found that cannibalism was likely the most important source of food. Over half had the beaks of D. gigas in their stomachs, and D. gigas was the most common prey item. The researchers do note, however, that squid jigged in the light field around the survey vessel showed much more cannibalism.

Until recently, claims of cooperative or coordinated hunting in D. gigas were considered unconfirmed and without scientific merit. However, research conducted between 2007 and 2011 indicates this species does engage in cooperative hunting.

=== Reproduction ===
Females lay gelatinous egg masses that are almost entirely transparent and float freely in the water column. The size of the egg mass correlates with the size of the female that laid it; large females can lay egg masses up to 3–4 m (10–13 ft) in diameter, while smaller females lay egg masses about one meter (3 1/4 ft) in diameter. Records of egg masses are extremely sparse because they are rarely encountered by humans, but from the few masses found to date, the egg masses seem to contain anywhere from 5,000 to 4.1 million eggs, depending on size.

== Relationship to humans ==
=== Aggression toward humans ===
Numerous accounts have the squid attacking fishermen and divers. Their coloring and aggressive reputation have earned them the nickname diablos rojos (red devils) from fishermen off the coast of Mexico, as they flash red and white when struggling on a line.

Although Humboldt squid have a reputation of being aggressive toward humans, some disagreement exists on this subject. Research suggests these squid are aggressive only while feeding; at other times, they are quite passive. Some scientists claim the only reports of aggression toward humans have occurred when reflective diving gear or flashing lights have been present as a provocation. Roger Uzun, a veteran scuba diver and amateur underwater videographer who swam with a swarm of the animals for about 20 minutes, said they seemed to be more curious than aggressive. In circumstances where these animals are not feeding or being hunted, they exhibit curious and intelligent behavior.

Recent footage of shoals of these animals demonstrates a tendency to meet unfamiliar objects aggressively. Having risen to depths of 130–200 m (430–660 ft) below the surface to feed (up from their typical 700 m (2,300 ft) diving depth, beyond the range of human diving), they have attacked deep-sea cameras and rendered them inoperable. Humboldt squid have also been observed engaging in swarm behavior when met by the lights of submersibles, suggesting that they may follow or are attracted to light. Reports of recreational scuba divers being attacked by Humboldt squid have been confirmed.

=== Fisheries ===
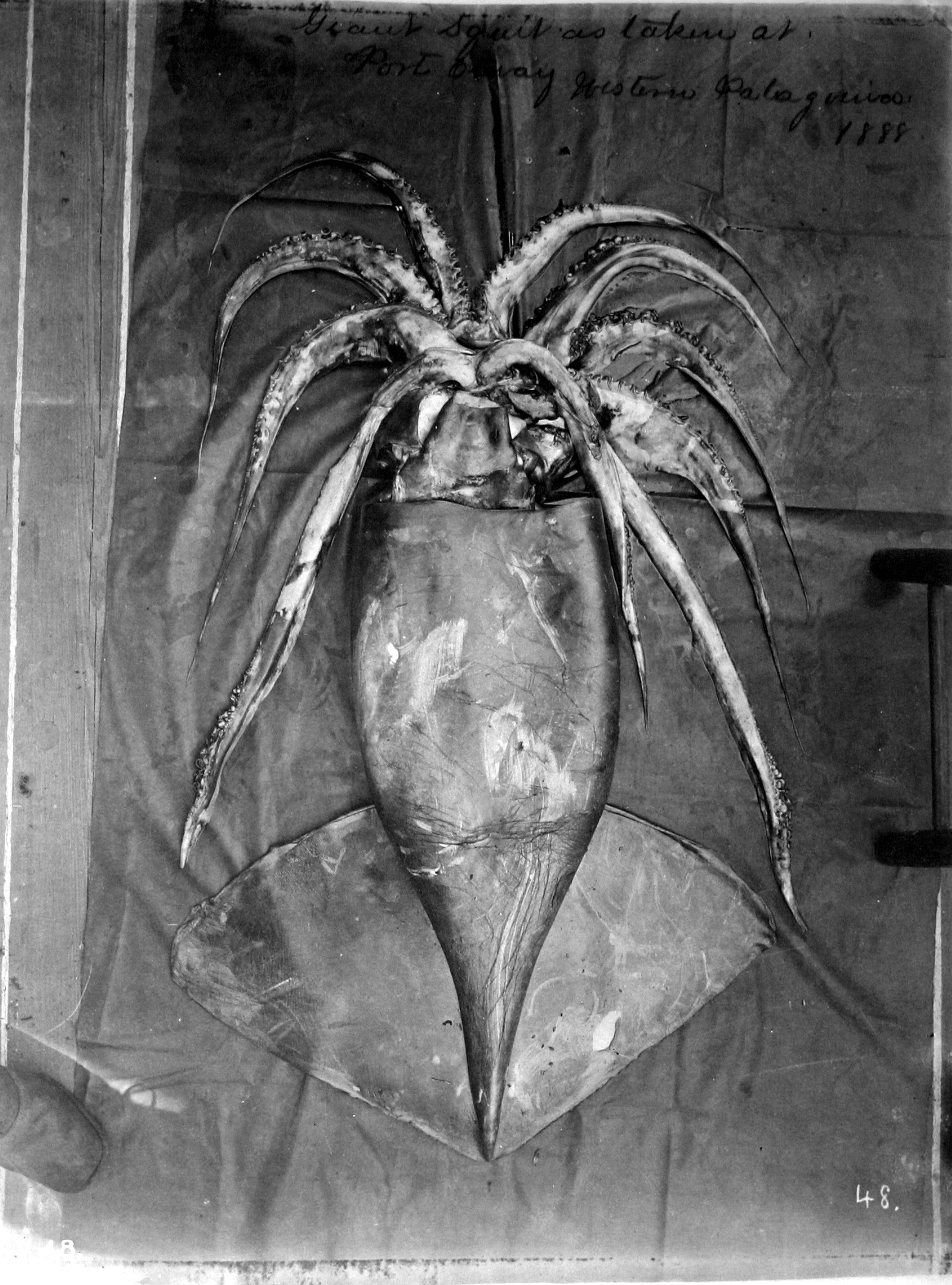
Squid as taken at Port Otway, western Patagonia, 1888

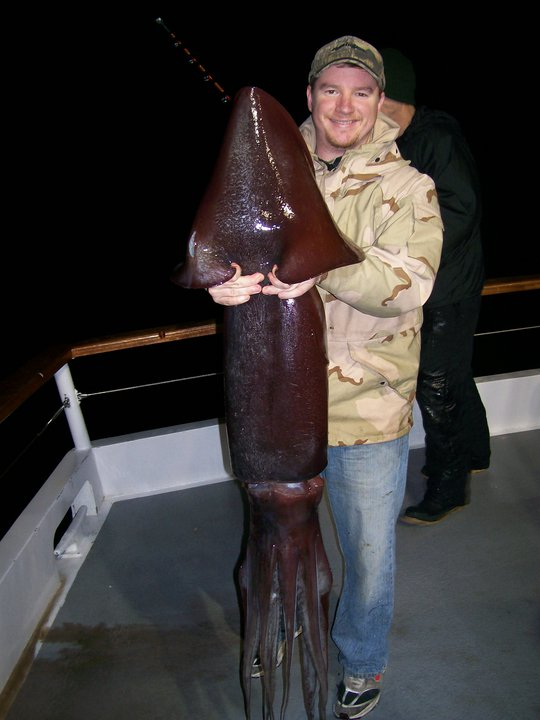
A 24-kilogram (52 lb) specimen caught off the southern Californian coast displays deep-red chromatophoric coloring.

Global capture production of Jumbo flying squid (Dosidicus gigas) in million tonnes from 1980 to 2022, as reported by the FAO

Commercially, this species has been caught to serve the European market (mainly Spain, Italy, France, and Ireland), Russia, China, Japan, Southeast Asia, and increasingly North and South American markets.

It is the most popular squid in the world; as of 2019 a third of all squid hunted is this species.

The method used by both artisanal fishermen as well as more industrial operations to catch the squid is known as jigging. Squid jigging is a relatively novel method of fishing in the Americas. It is done by handlining by artisanal fishermen, or by using mechanical jiggers. Jigging involves constantly jerking the line up and down to simulate prey; a reel with an elliptical or oval-shaped hub helps with this. Squid jigging is done at night, using bright overhead lights from the fishing boats which reflect brightly off the jigs and plankton in the seawater, luring the squid toward the surface to feed. They seem to prefer striking at the jigs from adjacent shadowed areas, especially the shade under the hull of the boat. Often as many as 8 to 12 jigs are on snoods on one handline, and many more are used on automated squid jigging systems. The lines are hung anywhere from 10 to 100 m (33 to 328 ft) in depth, depending on the power of the lamps used.

The jigs are called poteras in Spanish. Different types of jigs are suitable for either handlining or for mechanical jigging for jumbo squid. They are made from bakelite and/or stainless steel, and measure 75 to 480 mm (3 to 19 inches) in length. Jigs can have a single axis, or one to three 'arms' (ejes) which wave around when the jig is jerked, and a series of crowns (coronas) of bristle-like wire-hooks, the hooks lacking barbs, making up the tail. The body of the jigs is usually phosphorescent, but glow-in-the-dark lures may be attached to them. Jigs are extremely selective: not only can one type of jig attract only squid, often the jigs can select for a single species of squid, and even specific sizes of that species. The more arms and crowns, the more hooks, the higher the chances of snagging and actually reeling in the squid.

Since the 1990s, the most important areas for landings of Humboldt squid are Chile (122–297 thousand tonnes or 134–327 thousand short tons), Mexico (53–66 thousand tonnes or 58–73 thousand short tons), and Peru (291–435 thousand tonnes or 100–480 thousand short tons), in the period 2005–2007.

Based on 2009 national fisheries data, in Mexico this species represents 95% of the total recorded catch of squid. 88% of this is caught off the coasts of Sonora and Baja California Sur.

=== As food ===
Squid steaks, uncooked, in the USA

Because the flesh of the animals is saturated with ammonium chloride, which keeps them neutrally buoyant in seawater, the animal tastes unpleasantly salty, sour, and bitter when fresh (somewhat akin to salmiak). To make the squid more palatable for the frozen squid market, freshly caught Humboldt squid are commercially processed by first mechanically tenderizing them, dropping them in icy water with 1% mixture of lactic and citric acid for three hours, then washed, then soaked in another vat with a 6% brine solution for three hours. An alternate method for home cooks to neutralize the unpleasant taste also exists.

Compared to other types of seafood, Humboldt squid is inexpensive along their native South American Pacific coastline, retailing around US$0.30/kg in Peru, and about US$2.00/kg in Chile, in the early 2010s.

In Chile the squid is eaten in chupes and paila marina. In Peru, the practice of making ceviche from cheap squid began in the poorer parts of Lima when the meat became available in the 1990s, and has since spread to Cuzco. It is sold on the street in food carts, as well as cevicherias, restaurants dedicated to this cuisine. In the United States it is made into 'squid steaks'.

=== Model organism for early marine science in Latin America ===
In Chile, at the end of the 50s and early 60s, electrophysiological and neurophysiological studies were carried out by the Montemar Institute of Marine Biology, in Valparaiso, Chile. The remarkable size of the squid giant axon and squid giant synapse possessed by the Humboldt squid made it ideal for manipulative work in the laboratory. This research was chronicled in the documentary Montemar y Los Laberintos de la Memoria [Montemar and The Labyrinths of Memory]. 2016.

=== Conservation ===
A 2008 study predicted that ocean acidification will lower the Humboldt squid's metabolic rate by 31% and activity levels by 45% by the end of the 21st century. It also predicted that the squid would not be able to spend as much of the day in deeper and colder waters, as a larger proportion of the ocean would fall into the oxygen minimum zone.

A more recent study, however, provided empirical and theoretical evidence that the squid metabolism was unaffected by ocean acidification.

=== In popular media ===
The Humboldt squid was featured in the final episode of the 2009 BBC's Last Chance to See with Stephen Fry and Mark Carwardine. The episode was about blue whales, but the presenters interviewed fishermen who talked about the "exploding" diablo rojo population in the Sea of Cortez and human attacks, and showed a squid trying to take a bite of a protectively clad forearm.

In 2016 the squid featured in various television shows. Man Eating Super Squid: A Monster Invasion on the National Geographic Wild channel explored various attacks by Humboldt squid in Mexico. In the show, the squid is referred to as a real-life kraken and as "a global threat". The second show was River Monsters: Devil of the Deep, where show host Jeremy Wade talks to fishermen allegedly attacked by the squid in the Sea of Cortez, and then catches the animals off the coast of Peru. In the British Fishing Impossible, mail-clad divers plan to capture a Humboldt squid by hand in the Pacific Ocean, but are prevented from doing so due to bad weather. In BBC Earth's Blue Planet II the squid's cannibalistic pack hunting was captured on film for the first time.

== See also ==
- Cephalopod size
- Colossal squid
- Giant squid
- Thysanoteuthis rhombus
- Squid as food
- William Gilly§Humboldt squid
