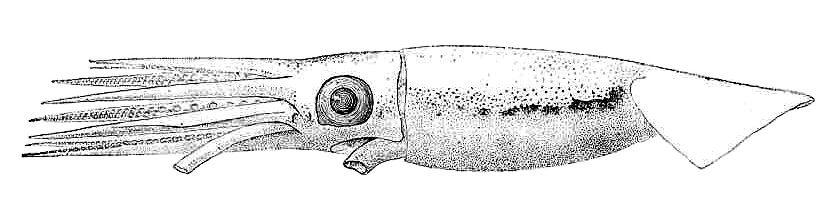

Conservation status
- Least Concern (IUCN 3.1)

Scientific classification
- Kingdom: Animalia
- Phylum: Mollusca
- Class: Cephalopoda
- Order: Oegopsida
- Family: Ommastrephidae
- Genus: Sthenoteuthis
- Species: S. pteropus

Binomial name
- Sthenoteuthis pteropus (Steenstrup, 1855)

Synonyms
- Architeuthis megaptera Verrill, 1878; Ommastrephes pteropus Steensrup, 1855; Ommatostrephes pteropus Steenstrup, 1855

= Sthenoteuthis pteropus =

Species of squid

Sthenoteuthis pteropus, also known as the orangeback flying squid or orangeback squid, is a species of cephalopod in the family Ommastrephidae. It is native to tropical parts of the Atlantic Ocean where it is found to depths of about 200 m (656 ft).

== Description ==
Like other squid, Sthenoteuthis pteropus is bilaterally symmetrical and has a head with a pair of eyes, eight arms and two tentacles and a fleshy, muscular body known as the mantle. The head is not retractable, the arms have blunt tips and there is a marked crest on the outer surface of the third pair. The tentacles are slender and the terminal sections are armed with a transverse row of large toothed suckers and other smaller suckers for capturing prey, and the column with a fixing apparatus of knobs and small suckers. The mantle is cylindrical, narrowing slightly towards the posterior end where there is a wide, roughly diamond-shaped fin. There are a number of bioluminescent photophores on the head, mantle and fourth arms, with a concentrated patch on the anterior dorsal surface of the mantle forming a luminous orange oval shape. Sthenoteuthis pteropus grows to a mantle length of about 65 cm (26 in) with a fin width about three quarters of this.

== Distribution and habitat ==
Sthenoteuthis pteropus is native to the tropical Atlantic Ocean with a range between about 35°N and 36°S and a rather more restricted breeding range that extends to about 22° on either side of the equator. It is a common epipelagic species and is found in the upper surface layers of the sea to a depth of 200 m (656 ft).

== Biology ==
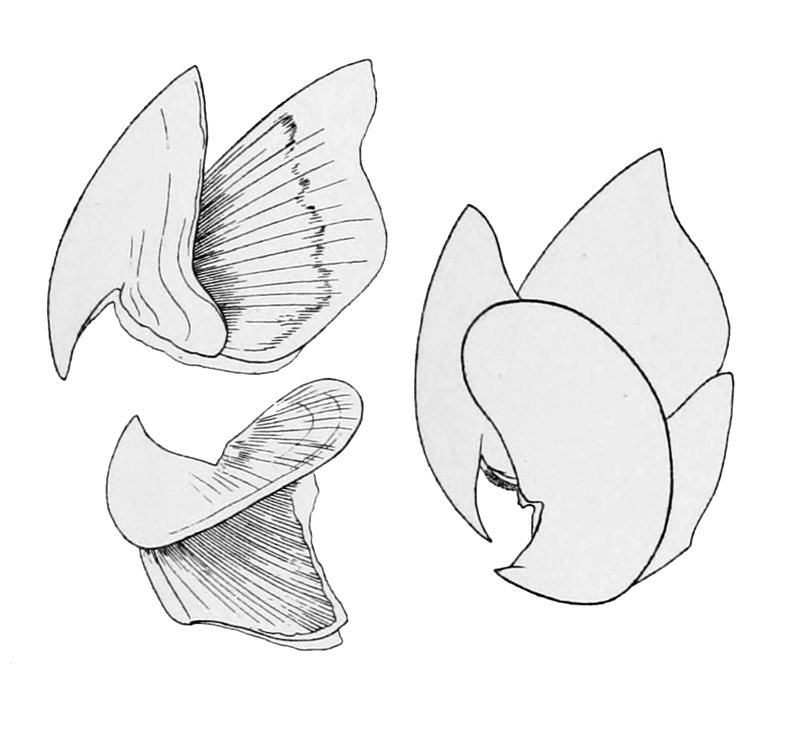
The beak of Sthenoteuthis pteropus

Squid can move fast through the water by jet propulsion, expelling a jet of water through a flexible siphon located on the ventral surface just behind the head. Some species can even launch themselves out of the water and move rapidly through air, remaining airborne for several metres. The phenomenon has been little studied because it happens so rarely and so unexpectedly, but it has been photographed on a small number of occasions, and Sthenoteuthis pteropus has sometimes tentatively been identified. The squid seems to be engaging in an active flying process rather than a passive glide as the fin is spread widely and the arms are held in such a position as might help provide lift. The squid were found to travel five times as fast in air as in water and it is thought that the behaviour may occur during long distance migrations in order to conserve energy.

Female Sthenoteuthis pteropus mature in two different size ranges, at mantle lengths of 23 to 27 cm (9 to 11 in) and 38 to 45 cm (15 to 18 in). In mature individuals, spawning takes place intermittently, up to a million ripe eggs with a diameter of about 0.8 mm (0.03 in) being present in the ovaries at any one time as well as a large number of immature oocytes. This seems consistent with a reproductive strategy consisting of producing large numbers of very small eggs, a long period of sporadic spawning and a continuation of feeding and growth by the female while breeding.

This is a fast-growing species of squid. Juveniles reach a length of about 10 cm (4 in) in one hundred days. The life expectancy of females is under a year while males live for one or two months less than this.
