= Japetus Steenstrup =

Danish zoologist, biologist, and professor (1813–1897)

Japetus Steenstrup FRS(For) HFRSE
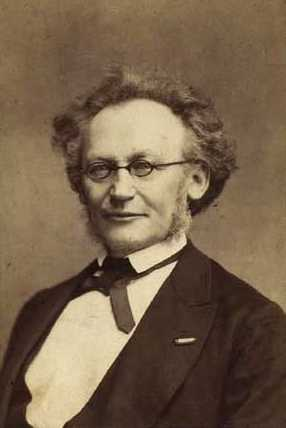
- Steenstrup in 1871
- Born: 8 March 1813; Vang, Thy, Denmark
- Died: 20 June 1897 (aged 84); Copenhagen
- Resting place: Assistens Kirkegaard, Copenhagen
- Education: University of Copenhagen
- Scientific career
- Fields: Zoology, Botany, geology, Archaeology
- Workplaces: University of Copenhagen, Denmark
- Doctoral students: Hans Christian Gram
- Author abbrev. (zoology): Steenstrup

Johannes Japetus Smith Steenstrup FRS(For) HFRSE (8 March 1813 – 20 June 1897) was a Danish zoologist, biologist, and professor.

== Life ==
Born in Vang, Thy on 8 March 1813, he held a lectorate in mineralogy in Sorø until 1845 when he became a professor of zoology at the University of Copenhagen. He worked on a great many subjects, including cephalopods, and also in genetics, where he discovered the principle of the alternation of generations in some parasitic worms in 1842.

Steenstrup discovered (1842) the possibility of using the subfossils of the Postglacial as a means of interpreting climate changes and correlated vegetation change, which he called succession in the recent past. Two of Steenstrup's students, Christian Vaupell and Eugen Warming further developed this line of research.

Japetus Steenstrup was a professor to zoologist Johan Erik Vesti Boas, who was also a student of zoologist Carl Gegenbaur, and Hans Christian Gram, inventor of the Gram stain.

During Charles Darwin's extensive study of barnacles (Cirripedia) between 1846 and 1854, he corresponded with Steenstrup, who sent him both information and specimens. Darwin returned the specimens in 1854, and by way of thanks also sent Steenstrup a box of specimens, with a letter listing the 77 species of cirripedia he had enclosed as a gift. The specimens were dispersed in the Natural History Museum of Denmark; in 2014 staff at the museum found the list, and were able to identify most of the specimens for a new exhibition of their best objects. When Darwin published his series of monographs, he included notes acknowledging his debt to the kindness of Professor Steenstrup for sending him specimens of both modern and fossil barnacles.

Together with Johan Lange, Steenstrup was the publisher of Flora Danica fasc. 44.

In 1842, at the age of 29, he was elected a member of the Kongelige Danske Videnskabernes Selskab. In 1857, he was elected a foreign member of the Royal Swedish Academy of Sciences. In 1862, he was elected as a member of the American Philosophical Society and in 1863 elected as member of the Royal Society.

He died on 20 June 1897 in Copenhagen.

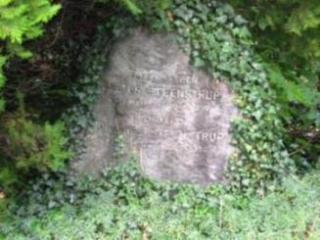
Japetus Steenstrup's gravestone at Assistens Kirkegård, Copenhagen
