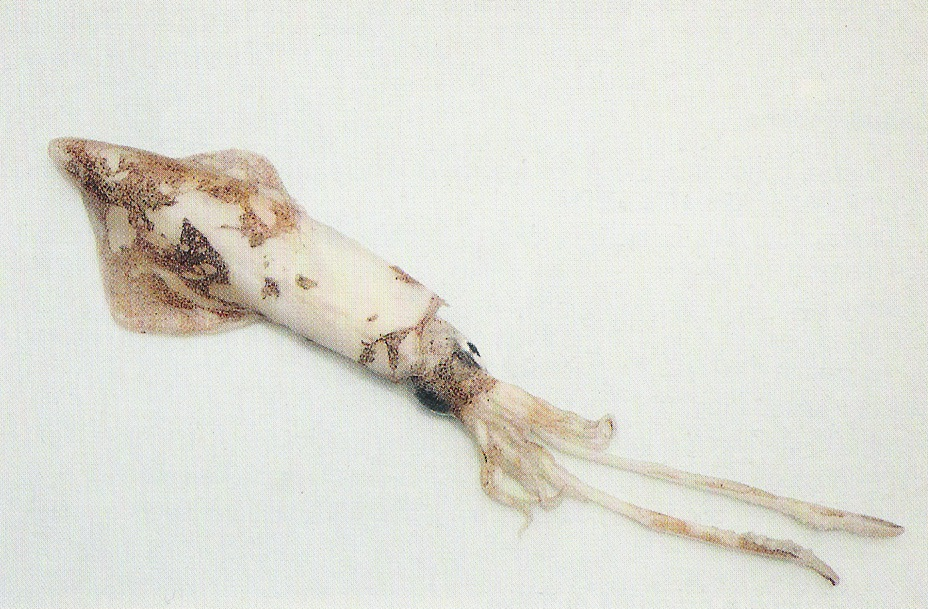
- Todarodes sagittatus

Scientific classification
- Domain: Eukaryota
- Kingdom: Animalia
- Phylum: Mollusca
- Class: Cephalopoda
- Order: Oegopsida
- Family: Ommastrephidae
- Subfamily: Todarodinae; Adam, 1960

Type genus
- Todarodes Steenstrup, 1880

Genera
- see text

= Todarodinae =

Subfamily of squids

Todarodinae is a squid subfamily in the family Ommastrephidae.

== Genera ==
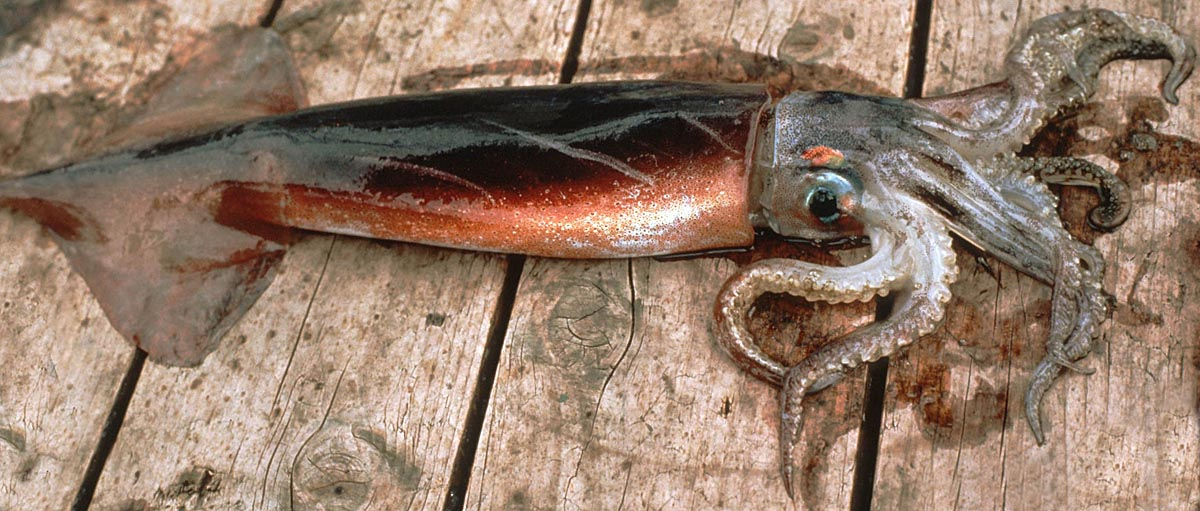
Martialia hyadesii

- Genus Martialia
  - Martialia hyadesii, sevenstar flying squid
- Genus Nototodarus
  - Nototodarus gouldi, Gould's flying squid
  - Nototodarus hawaiiensis, Hawaiian flying squid
  - Nototodarus sloanii, Wellington flying squid or New Zealand arrow squid
- Genus Todarodes
  - Todarodes angolensis, Angola flying squid
  - Todarodes filippovae, Antarctic flying squid
  - Todarodes pacificus, Japanese flying squid or Japanese common squid
  - Todarodes pusillus, little flying squid
  - Todarodes sagittatus, European flying squid
- Genus Todaropsis
  - Todaropsis eblanae, lesser flying squid
