= Angolan flying squid =

Conservation status
- Least Concern (IUCN 3.1)

Scientific classification
- Kingdom: Animalia
- Phylum: Mollusca
- Class: Cephalopoda
- Order: Oegopsida
- Family: Ommastrephidae
- Subfamily: Todarodinae
- Genus: Todarodes
- Species: T. angolensis

Binomial name
- Todarodes angolensis Adam, 1962

Species of squid

The Angolan flying squid (Todarodes angolensis) is a species of squid from the subfamily Todarodinae, part of the family Ommastrephidae. Due to taxonomic confusion with the Antarctic flying squid the exact limits of its distribution are uncertain but it is thought to be restricted to waters off Southern Africa.

== Description ==
The Angolan flying squid has the typical cylindrical mantle shape of the Todarodine squids with arrow shaped fins. It does not have visceral photophores. The tentacular club has a short carpal area and has only four pairs of suckers, a number which is distinct for this species. The suckers in the middle part of the manus have 13 to 16 long, pointed teeth on their rings there are 14-18 suckers on the manus arranged in four rows. The tentacles also bear four rows of suckers, the largest of which have 14-17 conical teeth in their rings alternating with square plates. The rings of the suckers on the arms have large distal teeth which alternate with very small teeth. The distal two fifths of the fourth right arm of males is hectocotylised and has thick pedicels rather than suckers which are almost entirely connected by the ventral protective membrane; the dorsal row of pedicels is flattened. The body is a dark purplish brown in colour.

== Distribution ==
The Angolan flying squid is certainly found off Southern Africa in the south-eastern Atlantic Ocean in the Benguela Current off Angola, Namibia and South Africa and it extends eastwards in to the Indian Ocean. However, some sources list it as having a wider distribution but see taxonomic note below.

== Habitat and biology ==
The Angolan flying squid is mainly found in the upper slope, benthic habitat of the South African continental slope at depths of between 300m and 500m, as is the lesser flying squid (Todaropsis eblanae) and these two species are considered indicator species for this zone. The adults are restricted to near the bottom during the day while the juveniles occur in all depths apart from the surface, which they avoid during the day. During the night the adult squid move up the watercoilumn and can be found at various depths but still avoid the surface and the juveniles are most abundant at depths of 60m-80m. Normally the young squid show a preference for the epipelagic zone.

In a population off Namibia the sex showed a clear predominance of females over males, which has also been observed in the congeneric European flying squid (Todarodes sagittatus). This may be due to differing habitat preferences of males and females and that the only meet to spawn. The smallest mature male has a mantle length of 240mm and the smallest mature female measured 250mm. Studies of certain anatomical features suggest that females become sexually mature at mantle lengths of between 300mm to 350 mm The sub-adult and adult squid are most abundant during the Southern spring, from October to December. Analysis of statoliths suggest that the life span of this species is roughly one year but growth rates are subject to considerable individual variation and are correlated variable environmental effects of the northern Benguela Upwelling System.

Angolan flying squid are opportunistic predators and their prey includes a variety of fish species such as the Cape hake Merluccius capensis, in the northern Benguela Current. It is also an important prey item for a number of predatory fish species sharks and marine mammals and may make up the majority of their diet.

== Fisheries ==
The Angolan flying squid is not directly targeted by fisheries but it is infrequently caught as bycatch in fisheries pursuing other species.

== Taxonomic note ==
There is uncertainty in the distribution of the Angolan flying squid as there is some confusion over its true taxonomic position which has confused its separation from the Antarctic flying squid. This has led to some authorities describing it as circum global in the southern oceans but others in saying that it is restricted to the waters off Southern Africa.
