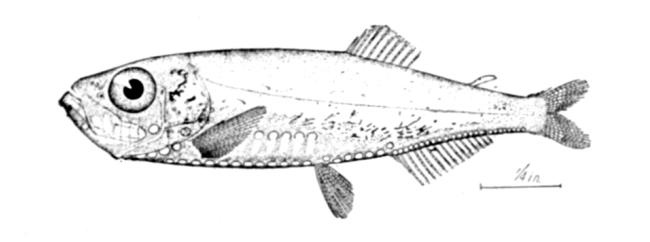

Conservation status
- Least Concern (IUCN 3.1)

Scientific classification
- Kingdom: Animalia
- Phylum: Chordata
- Class: Actinopterygii
- Division: Teleostei
- Order: Stomiiformes
- Family: Sternoptychidae
- Genus: Maurolicus
- Species: M. muelleri

Binomial name
- Maurolicus muelleri (J. F. Gmelin, 1789)

Synonyms
- Salmo muelleri Gmelin, 1789

= Mueller's pearlside =

Species of fish

Maurolicus muelleri, commonly referred to as Mueller's pearlside, Mueller's bristle-mouth fish (not to be confused with the Gonostomatidae), or the silvery lightfish (not to be confused with the Phosichthyidae), is a marine hatchetfish in the genus Maurolicus, found in deep tropical, subtropical and temperate waters of the Pacific Ocean and the Atlantic Ocean, from the surface to depths of 1,500 metres (4,900 ft). It can grow to a maximum total length of 8 centimetres (3.1 in).

== Distribution and habitat ==
Maurolicus muelleri is found across the Pacific and Atlantic Oceans from subpolar waters to the equator, as well as in the Mediterranean, however they are absent in the Indian Ocean. M. muelleri is most abundant around bathymetric features such as seamounts and continental shelf breaks, and is scarce in the open ocean. This species is predominantly found at depths of around 150 to 250 metres (490 to 820 ft) during the day, but can be found as shallow as 50 metres (160 ft) during the nighttime. They can be found in depths of at least 1,527 metres (5,010 ft) at maximum. It lives in tropical, subtropical and temperate waters in the deep sea.

== Description ==
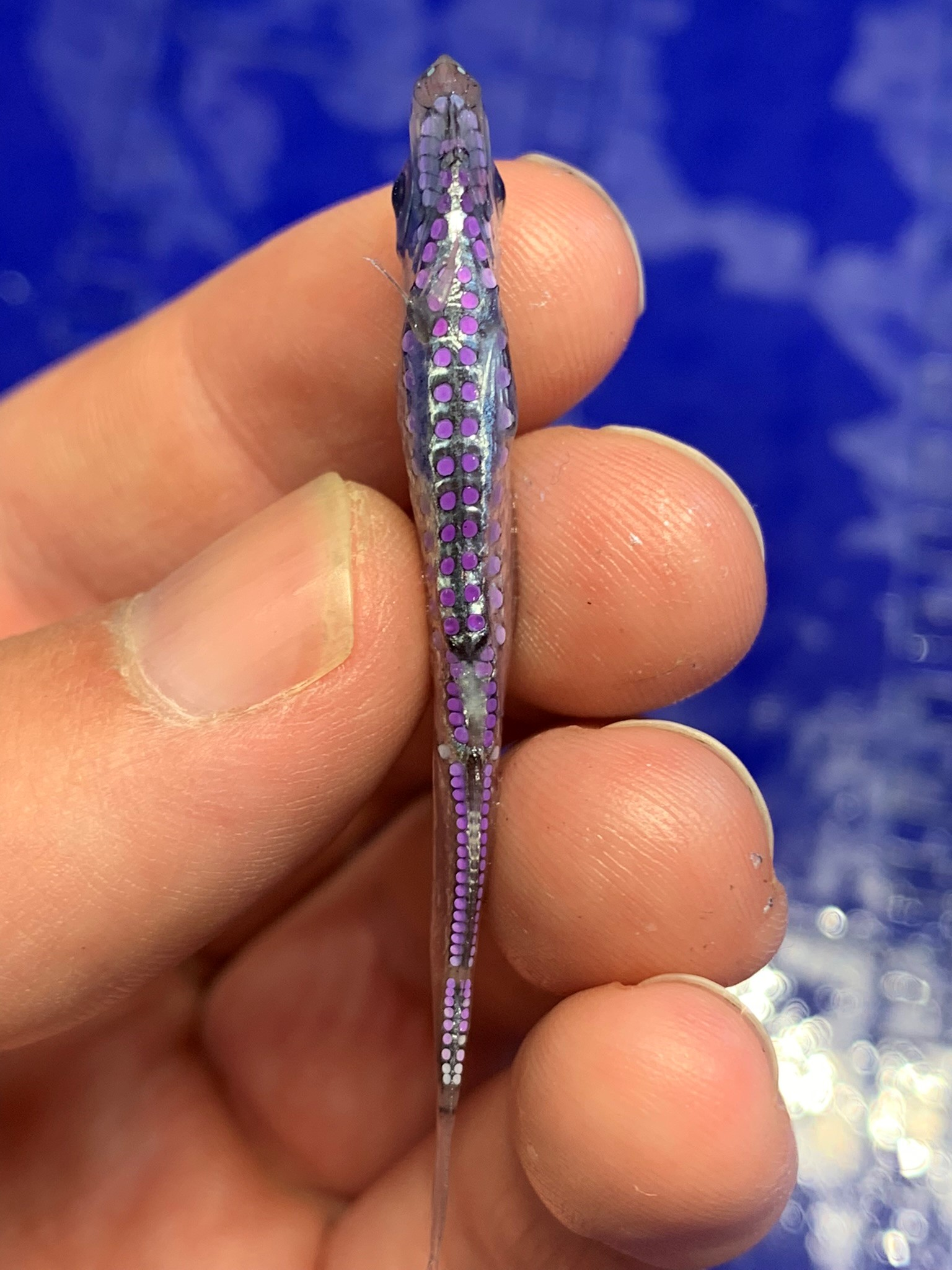
Ventral view of M. muelleri, showing the photophores used for counterillumination.

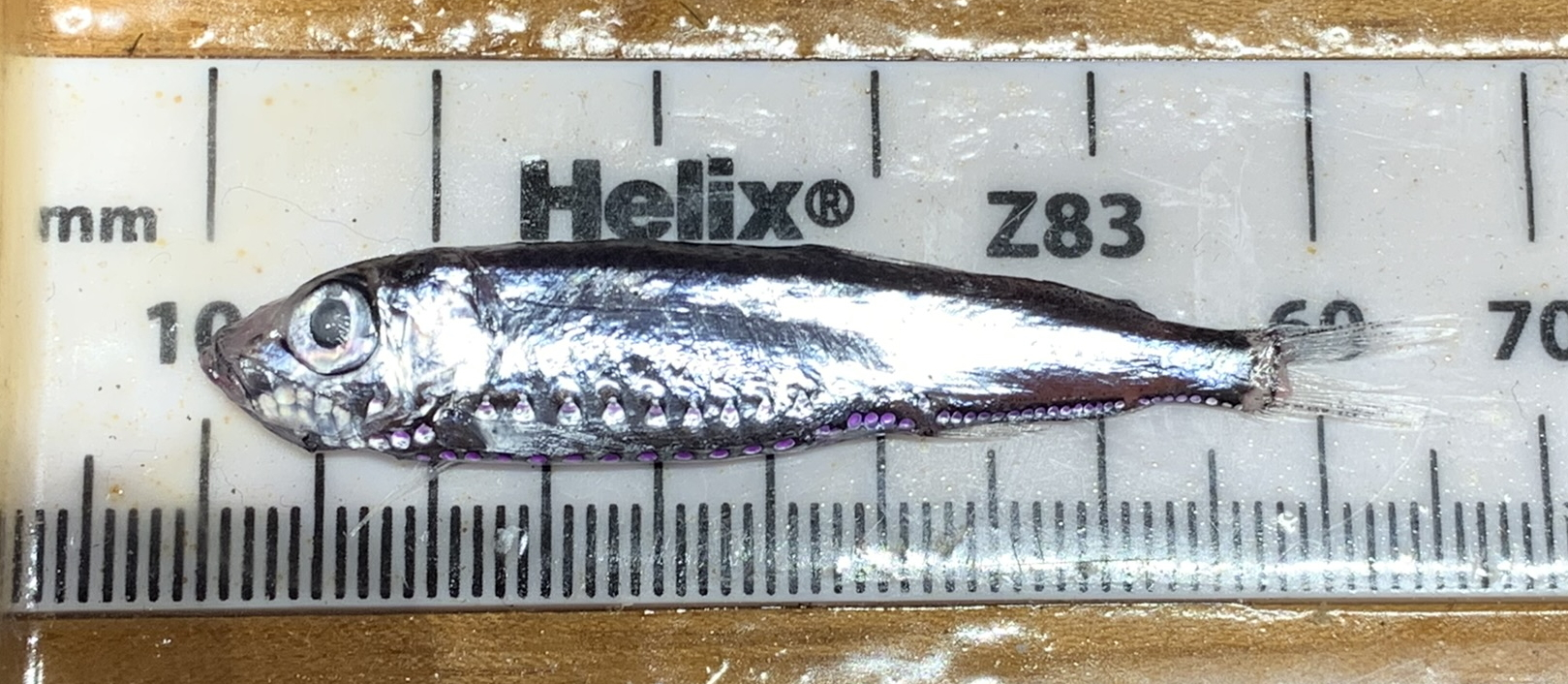
Fresh-caught specimen of Maurolicus muelleri

Maurolicus muelleri has a fusiform body shape with a moderately sized, subvertical mouth. M. muelleri is countershaded to provide camouflage in the open-ocean, with a dark dorsal surface, silvered flanks and clustered photophores on the ventral surface for counterillumination. In fresh-caught specimens, these photophores are coloured a light pink/purple. They have 9 to 12 dorsal fin rays, 17–19 pectoral fin rays, 7 pelvic fin rays and 22 to 28 anal fin rays. They can grow up to 8 centimetres (3.1 in) at maximum length, but usually grows up to 4 centimetres (1.6 in).

=== Photophores ===
Photophores are glandular organs that, in M. muelleri, are made up of several parts. The photogenic chamber, made up of small, spherical light-producing cells, is split into a subspherical tank and conic projector, embedded inside a reflector made of guanine crystals. Ventral to the photogenic chamber is a cellular lens that is itself covered on the ventral surface by a gelatinous dioptric layer.

=== Eyes ===
Maurolicus muelleri has large eyes with a retina uniquely adapted to the animal's mesopelagic habitat. M. muelleri inhabits surface waters only during twilight hours, requiring acute mesopic vision which in most vertebrates is achieved through combining dim-light rod cells and bright-light cone cells. Fish in the genus Maurolicus have developed a unique photoreceptor where a cone opsin and phototransduction cascade is found in cells transmuted into a rod-like morphology. These rod-like cone receptors are tuned to the blue-shifted mesopic light conditions dominant in M. muelleri's habitat and are likely a more efficient method of mesopic vision than would be feasible with two improperly-functioning photoreceptor types.

== Ecology ==
=== Trophic ecology ===
Mueller's pearlside is a zooplanktivore, with exact diet composition varying geographically and seasonally. For example, copepods are the main constituent of their diet in the Sea of Japan and in waters surrounding Korea, with the euphausiid species Euphausia pacifica of secondary importance near Japan. Euphausiids and copepods are the dominant prey items year-round off near the eastern continental slope of Tasmania. In Masfjorden, Norway, copepods are most important in the autumn, while earlier in the year cladocerans are most important. Amphipods and pteropods have also been reported from stomach contents.

Maurolicus muelleri inhabits a tertiary trophic position and, as such, provides a trophic link between zooplankton and larger predators. A wide range of fish species prey on M. muelleri, including commercially-important species such as albacores, skipjack tuna, hake, and blue whiting. They are also predated on by several cephalopods, including the squids Illex coindetii and Todaropsis eblanae and the octopus Enteroctopus magnificus, and marine mammals including common dolphins, sei whales, Bryde's whales, and fin whales.

=== Parasitology ===
Due to its trophic position, M. muelleri plays a role as an intermediate or paratenic host to a variety of parasitic taxa, with very few parasites reaching adulthood while infecting the pearlside. For example, in a study that examined 1329 individual Maurolicus muelleri specimens, 3720 parasites were found with only five individual adult parasites. Endoparasites recorded from Maurolicus muelleri include the trematodes Derogenes varicose, Brachyphallus crenatus, and Lecithaster confusus, cestodes including Bothriocephalus sp. and Scolex pleuronectis, the nematodes Hysterothylacium aduncum and Anisakis simplex. One of the only species to reach adulthood parasitising M. muelleri is the ectoparasitic copepod Sarcotretes scopeli. A "fungoid mass", tentatively identified as being from the protist genus Ichthyophonus, has been identified in pearlsides caught near Australia.

== Behavior ==
=== Diel vertical migration ===
As with many mesopelagic species, Maurolicus muelleri undergoes diel vertical migration (DVM), however this behaviour is more complex and varied in M. muelleri than that descriptor usually entails. The specific nature of this migration can vary seasonally, between years, an across geography, as well as across the ontogeny of individual fishes.

The vertical migration of M. muelleri has been best studied in Masfjorden, where a fifteen-month acoustic survey was undertaken. In Masfjorden, M. muelleri formed distinct scattering layers, with the deepest layer composed of adults and a shallow layer composed of post-larvae. The depth of these scattering layers is thought to be a result of M. muelleri having a "light comfort zone", inhabiting depths where light levels are neither too bright nor too dark. Individual fish may move between scattering layers, indicating that the comfort zones are broader than suggested in the typical isolume hypothesis. Here, M. muelleri displayed consistent, typical DVM patterns (i.e. remaining at depth during the day and ascending to the surface at night) during summer months only, with individuals feeding at dawn and dusk.

Their behaviour, however, varied in the autumn and winter. In years where their Calanus copepod prey, which overwinter at depth, were abundant, adults in the winter delayed their vertical migration until approximately three hours before dawn due potentially to a reduced need to feed at the surface, with some individuals remaining at depth for the entire night, feeding entirely on deep-overwintering prey. Towards the end of the winter, adults underwent interrupted ascents, migrating to depths that were greater than reached during typical DVM as they preyed on deep-wintering prey partway through their seasonal ascent to the surface. Some individuals undertook a reversed DVM during winter, diving to slightly greater depths during daylight hours, to feed on deep-overwintering prey in optimal light conditions. In the Benguela system and in the Gulf of Oman, DVM is known to occur, with fish ascending to within 10m of the surface in response to the first light of dawn before diving into deep waters.

=== Predator evasion ===
In latitudes where summer nights are short and bright, such as in the Arctic Circle, M. muelleri may school in shallow waters at night to reduce the threat of predation. Maurolicus muelleri in scattering layers can detect predators at distances of several metres during the day, and respond by diving as far as 50m below their original depths at speeds of 15–20 cm/s. While most individuals reside in scattering layers to reduce predation risk, certain "bold individuals" will make forays into shallower waters above scattering layers, presumably in order to feed in move favourable light levels. It is unknown whether these bold individuals are atypical or whether a change in individual state (e.g. hunger) prompts these forays.

== Life History ==
Spawn timing in Maurolicus muelleri is regionally variable. In the Benguela system, breeding occurs year-round, while in Australia spawning occurs in late winter and early spring. In Norway, spawning occurs between March and September, however hatch timing is a strong predictor of recruitment success, with individuals hatching before mid-September experiencing poor conditions for growth. Females mature at lengths of around 35mm, at the end of their first year, and fish below 30mm cannot be sexed. A small fraction of individuals survive into their second year, reaching lengths of up to 50mm in Australia.

Individual females can contain as many as 738 ova, and in enclosed spaces eggs can be extremely abundant, reaching numbers as high as 5.8x10^11 in Fensfjorden. Eggs settle at a depth of around 200m in the Benguela system. The eggs are surrounded by a distinctive hexagonal-patterned membrane.

== Importance to Fisheries ==
At present, M. muelleri is of minor importance to fisheries, with several countries, including Russia, Iceland, and the Faroe Islands attempting to pursue it as a resource after the collapse of other fisheries, with no nation landing more than 50,000 tonnes in a single year. The species continues to be a focus of speculation for future mesopelagic fisheries, however a number of technical hurdles will need to be surmounted in order to make pearlsides a cost-effective fishery target.
