= N. gouldi =

N. gouldi may refer to:

- Nototodarus gouldi, the Gould's squid, a squid species in the genus Nototodarus found in Australia and New Zealand
- Nyctophilus gouldi, the Gould's long-eared bat, a bat species found in Australia

== See also ==
- Gouldi (disambiguation)
