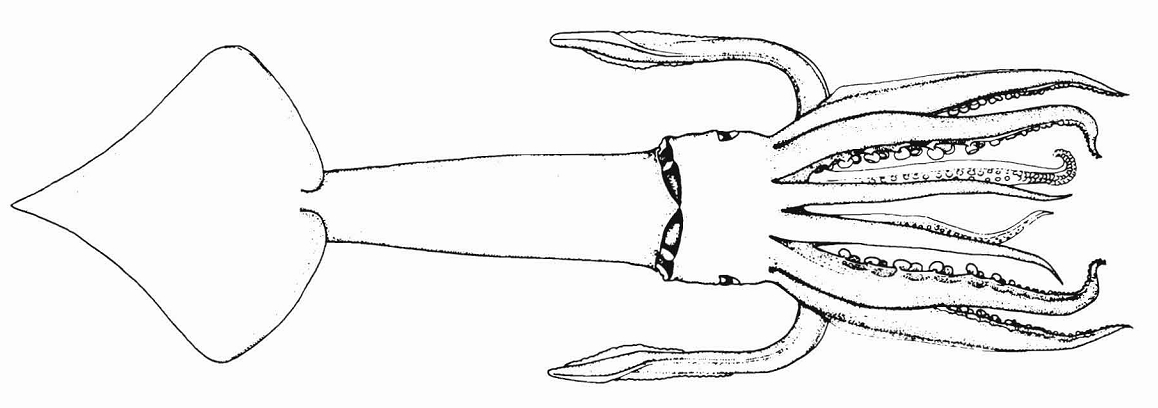
- Dorsal aspect

Conservation status
- Least Concern (IUCN 3.1)

Scientific classification
- Kingdom: Animalia
- Phylum: Mollusca
- Class: Cephalopoda
- Order: Oegopsida
- Family: Ommastrephidae
- Genus: Illex
- Species: I. oxygonius

Binomial name
- Illex oxygonius Roper, Lu & Mangold, 1969

= Illex oxygonius =

Sharptail shortfin squid Illex oxygonius

Species of squid

Illex oxygonius, commonly known as the sharptail shortfin squid, is a species of neritic squids in the family Ommastrephidae. Of the species of the genus Illex, they have the most restricted range, being found only in the western North Atlantic Ocean; from off New Jersey, south to the Straits of Florida and into the Gulf of Mexico. They are very difficult to distinguish from Illex coindetii and Illex illecebrosus, with which their geographic range overlaps. The most obvious difference of I. oxygnius is their sharper fin angles of 25° to 40° (hence their common name). There is also the possibility that they may be a hybrid of I. coindetii and I. illecebrosus.
