= Arrow squid =

Arrow squid is a common name for a squid.

Species called arrow squids include:

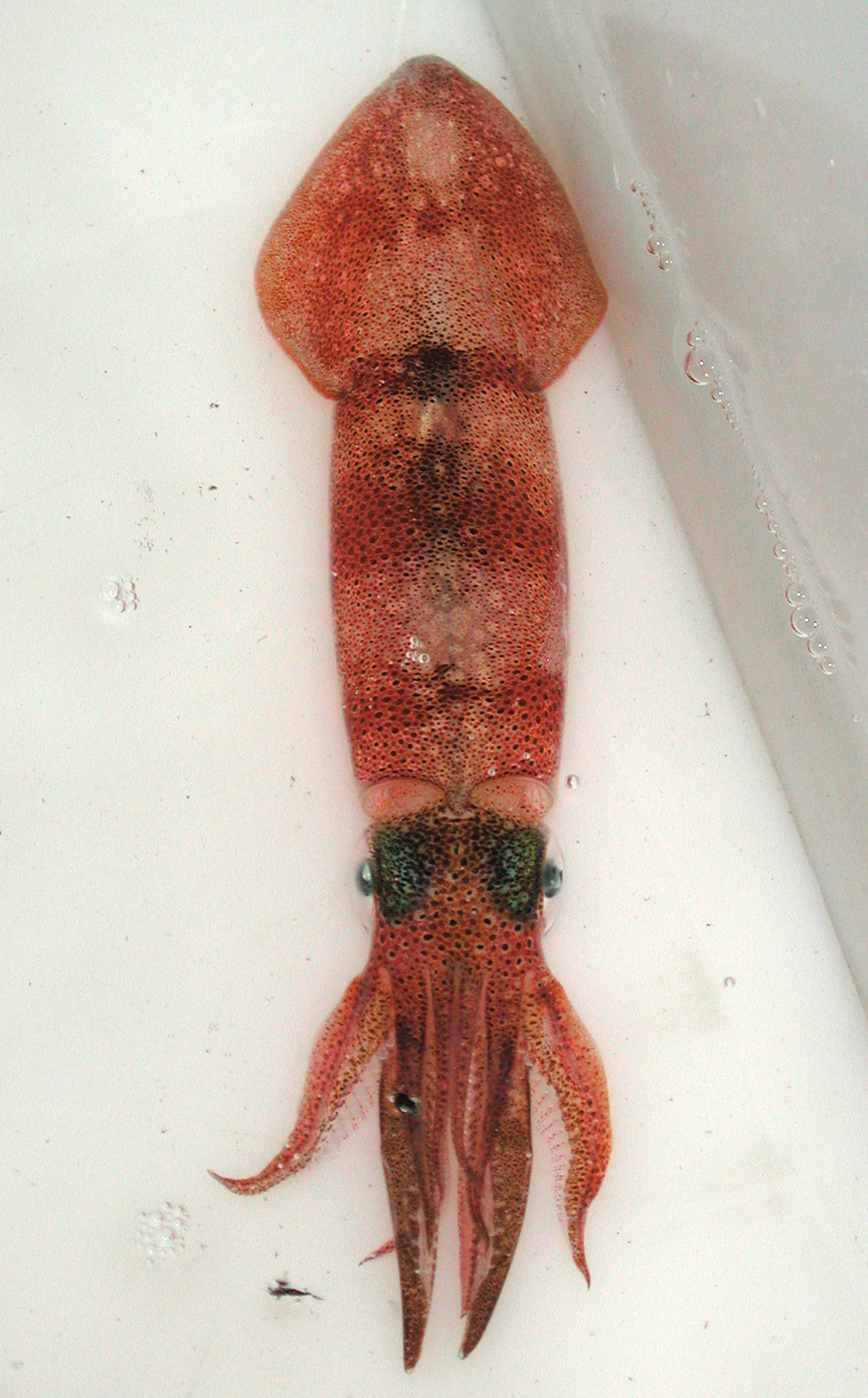
61 centimeter specimen of Slender inshore squid

- Doryteuthis plei, the slender inshore squid
- Heterololigo bleekeri, the spear squid
- Nototodarus gouldi, Gould's squid
- Nototodarus sloanii, the New Zealand arrow squid
