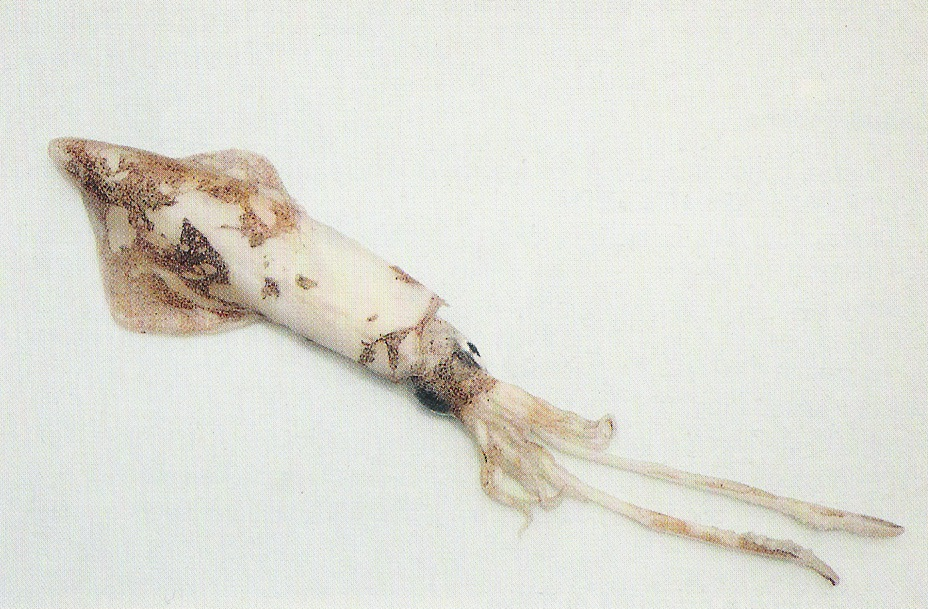

Conservation status
- Least Concern (IUCN 3.1)

Scientific classification
- Kingdom: Animalia
- Phylum: Mollusca
- Class: Cephalopoda
- Order: Oegopsida
- Family: Ommastrephidae
- Genus: Todarodes
- Species: T. sagittatus

Binomial name
- Todarodes sagittatus (Lamarck, 1798)

Synonyms
- Loligo sagittata Lamarck, 1798; Loligo todarus Rafinesque, 1814; Loligo sagitta Blainville, 1828; Loligo aequipoda Vérany, 1851; Ommastrephes sagittatus (Lamarck, 1798); Ommatostrephes sagittatus (Lamarck, 1798)

= European flying squid =

Species of squid

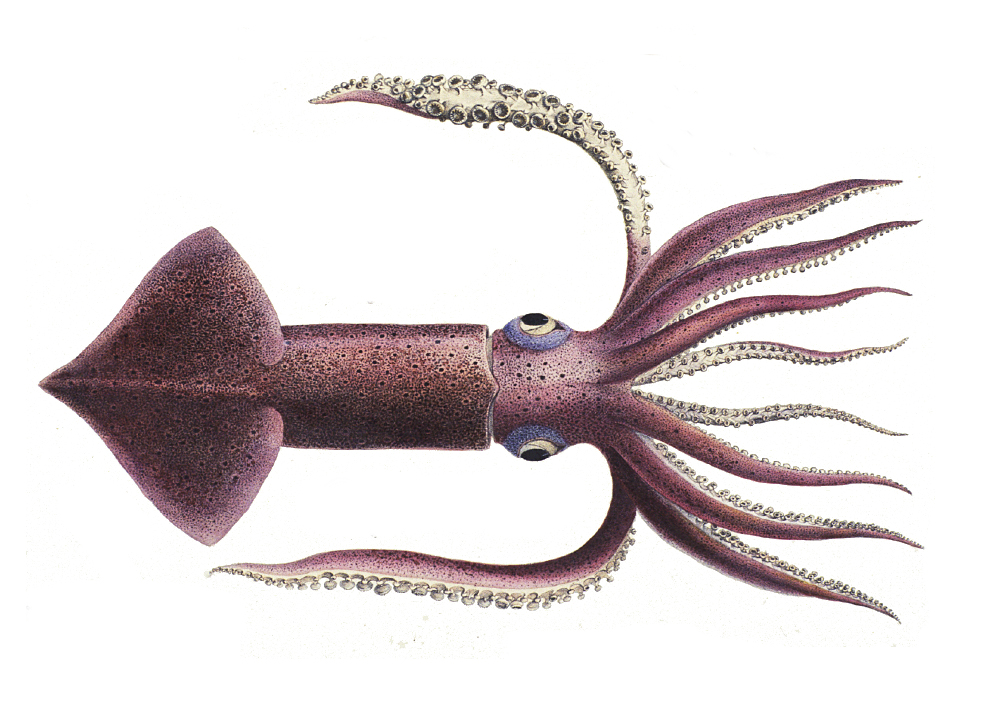
dorsal view

The European flying squid (Todarodes sagittatus) is a species of squid from the continental slope and oceanic waters of the eastern Atlantic Ocean and the Mediterranean Sea. It is the type species of the genus Todarodes, the type genus of the subfamily Todarodinae of the pelagic squid family Ommastrephidae. It is a species which is targeted by some fisheries, although it is more often a bycatch.

== Description ==
The European flying squid is a large species of squid with a maximum reported size of 750mm measured by mantle length for an unsexed specimen, while the largest mantle length known for a male is 640 mm. These animals commonly have mantle lengths of between 250mm and 350 mm. They have a slender, long and muscular mantle with terminal, wide and strong fins, the length of the fins being equivalent to 45% of the mantle length, and, when considered as a single fin unit, just slightly wider than it is long and tapering to a point posteriorly. The funnel groove has a foveola which does not have side pockets. The tentacular club is very long and extends over three quarters of the length of the contracted tentacle, the club's suckers are held on the elongated carpus in 10 to 12 pairs; the sucker rings of the medial manus suckers have 17 to 20 long pointed teeth; the suckers of the manus are arranged in four series of 14 to 18 rows; the suckers on the dactylus are also arranged in 4 rows. The arm suckers have an enlarged central tooth, 7 to 9 regular teeth and have almost no small alternating teeth. There are no light organs on the viscera. The arms are slender and are more than double the length of the head. The fourth right arm is hectocotylised in males and has the terminal suckers modified into fleshy papillae. The body is dark purplish in colour.

== Distribution ==
The European flying squid is found in the eastern Atlantic from Greenland and Iceland to the Arctic waters of the Russian Federation, in the lower Barents Sea and Kara Sea, to 13°S to the south of the Gulf of Guinea and to about 40°W; its distribution also includes the North Sea, Mediterranean Sea and the Sea of Marmara.

== Habitat and biology ==
The European flying squid is an oceanic, neritic species of squid that can be found from the surface to depths in excess of 1000 metres and it has been taken in United Kingdom territorial waters at 4,595 m. It is occasionally recorded among the fauna of the seabed on the continental shelf or the upper continental slope, for example off northwest Africa where it is commonly found between 350 and 700 metres.

This species undertakes migrations for feeding and as it matures in the North Atlantic. Large schools appear offshore near southern Iceland, the Faroe Islands, Norway and sometimes Scotland in the early summer, and they stay in these areas until the onset of winter. The stranding of large numbers of European flying squid along nearby coastlines is relatively frequent in the summer months in these areas. With the arrival of winter, the squid move to deeper water further offshore where they spend the winter. The populations of the warmer seas off the northwestern African coast and in the western Mediterranean are more sedentary by comparison.

The European flying squid is recorded in large numbers from March to May on the fishing grounds around Madeira, as well as in other areas of the eastern central Atlantic Ocean. Here the squid make ontogenetic movements as well, from the continental shelf to the continental slope and deep waters. This species is also known to undertake daily vertical migrations being found near the sea bed or at depths during the day and moving up to the surface and near-surface waters at night, however they are caught at night in deeper waters indicating that a proportion of the population do not always undertake vertical migrations. Squids of this species may be found solitarily or in small groups but as their trophic migration progresses they form large schools on the continental shelves in the waters of the northern Atlantic and off northwest Africa.

The sex ratio of the European flying squid almost always shows a preponderance of females and there are very few males captured. This appears to be mainly a result of ecological factors as the feeding grounds are sexually segregated and they only meet during spawning. The males may be sedentary, living most of their lives in the breeding areas where they may not participate in the daily vertical feeding movements and remain at depth. The males attain sexual maturity at a smaller size and younger age than the females. In general, the larger animals are found in the cooler areas of its distribution.

In the European flying squid spawning is most likely to be continuous throughout the year on the continental slope, but there are distinct seasonal peaks in late winter or early spring in the northeastern Atlantic. In the Balearic Sea of the western Mediterranean spawning peaks between September and November. The length of the spermatophore depends on the size of the males and on their geographic origin; being relatively larger (48 to 54 mm) in the Balearic Sea than in the population off North Africa (20 to 29 mm). The female fecundity is high, and each bears up to several hundred thousand eggs, depending on the size of females. The females reduce their feeding activity before spawning, and their spawning is characterized by intermittent egg laying, with the numbers of eggs in each egg mass decreasing. Spawning occurs in depths between 200 m and 800 m) and apparently takes place near the bottom. The early life cycle is not well known but observations on juveniles over the mid-Atlantic Ridge suggests that they are carried by currents and spread in the upper layers of the water column between 50 and 150 m), although they may go deeper in the daylight hours. Paralarvae observed in coastal waters off North Africa have been observed to rise to the layer just below the surface over the continental slope to feed before migrating as juveniles to the continental shelf. Their growth rate is high, especially in their early life phases but slows as they attain sexual maturity. Their life cycle is thought to take just over a single year to complete, based on statolith analysis but the larger squid of over 500mm mantle length are thought to be 18 months to two years old.

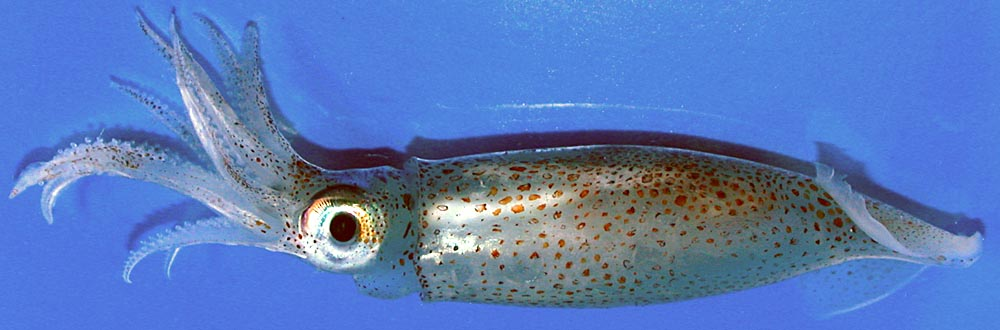
T.sagittatus juvenile

The European flying squid preys on fish, crustaceans and cephalopods. In the more northerly part of its range small Atlantic herring (Clupea harenqus) are the main prey as are Atlantic cod (Gadus morhua). Other studies have shown that prey includes pelagic species of fish, for example blue whiting (Micromesistius poutassou) and herring as well as mesopelagic fish like Maurolicus muelleri, they also prey on pelagic crustaceans, and cephalopods with cannibalism being quite frequent, with conspecifics being the second most common cephalopod prey. In the Macaronesian Islands lanternfish were the most common and diverse prey, while off northern Norway the most common prey were fish, crustaceans and polychaetes. Its predators include a variety of top Oceanic predators such as tuna, swordfish, sharks, seals and cetaceans. It is an important prey for some species of dolphin and this species along with Illex coindetii and Todaropsis eblanae, are the most important intermediate host for Anisakid nematodes, which are intestinal parasites.

== Fisheries ==
The European flying squid is predominantly taken as a bycatch of trawl fisheries for other species, but it is also fished by jigging and purse seining. In the summer months it is targeted by commercial and recreational fishermen in southern Italy. The flesh is eaten either fresh or boiled, it preserved by commercial freezing, salting or drying. The species is also utilised as bait in fisheries for cod and halibut. The population is not subject to any specific management measures and the total population consists of several geographically distinct populations. The stocks vary over time as the environment varies. From the late 20th Century to the present the mean catch has been 3,000 tonnes, although this has varied widely, with the largest catches being recorded in 1981–1985. Off Europe the species is taken in association with other members of the family Ommastrephidae and much of the catch is not identified to species. Over the 25 years to 2014 no obvious trend in stocks could be identified and it is therefore assessed as least concern.

In Italy it has its own common name totano, while all other species of squids (except sometimes non Mediterranean species that resemble it) are generically called calamari.
