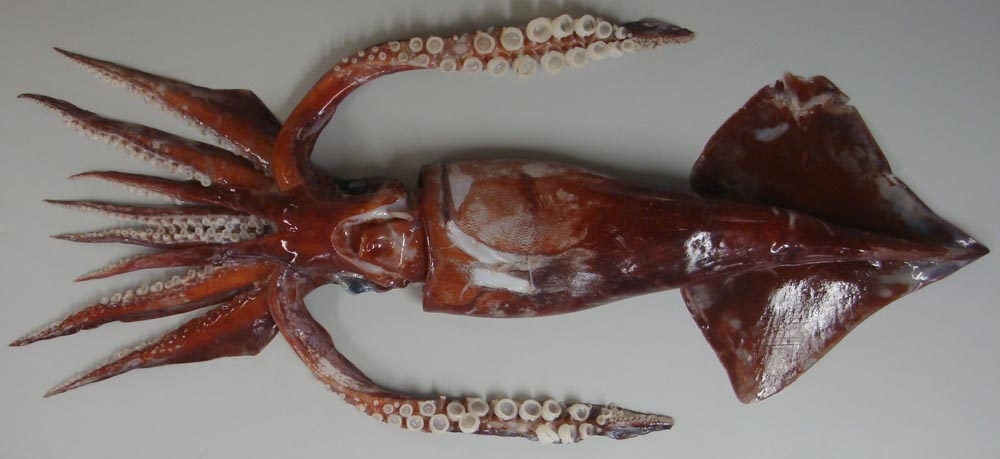

Conservation status
- Least Concern (IUCN 3.1)

Scientific classification
- Kingdom: Animalia
- Phylum: Mollusca
- Class: Cephalopoda
- Order: Oegopsida
- Family: Ommastrephidae
- Subfamily: Todarodinae
- Genus: Todarodes
- Species: T. filippovae

Binomial name
- Todarodes filippovae Adam, 1975

= Antarctic flying squid =

Species of squid

The Antarctic flying squid (Todarodes filippovae) is a species of squid from the subfamily Todarodinae of the family Ommastrephidae, a family of pelagic squid from the order Oegopsida. It has a circumglobal distribution in the seas around the lower latitudes of the Southern Ocean.

== Description ==
The Antarctic flying squid is a large species of oceanic pelagic squid which grows to a mantle length of greater than 52 cm in females and 40 cm in males. It has a long, narrow and muscular mantle, which has a width which is roughly a quarter of its length, tapering posteriorly to a pointed tail. The fins are arrowhead shaped and both their length and width are roughly equivalent to half that of the mantle.

The basal suckers on the arms have around 10 teeth but there are no alternating small teeth. The fourth right arm has a hectocotylised distal portion which takes up one fifth to one third of the arm's length. This portion has the suckers transformed to papillae and tubercles, a ventral protective membrane and an expansive development of trabeculae. The robust and large tentacles have almost their entire length taken up by the tentacular clubs which have 12-14 transverse rows of suckers on the manus, the largest of which has 7-13 teeth on its ring and a diameter equal to 2.7-4.5% of the mantle length. The tentacle also has two pairs of carpal suckers.

== Distribution ==
The Antarctic flying squid has a circumglobal distribution in the Southern Ocean south of 35°S and it is common in the waters of the subtropical convergence zone. It has been found as far north as Peru but these are thought to have drifted north on the Humboldt Current.

== Habitat and biology ==
The Antarctic flying squid occurs over the continental slope and oceanic waters with depths between 0 and 1,200m. It has been caught from near to the bottom, through the water column to near the surface at night. This species is associated with faster currents and with a wide variation in temperature from cold Antarctic water 1t 3-3.6 °C to waters as warm as 24 °C. The spawning season occurs between December and August when mature males form a greater proportion of the population off southern New South Wales, this suggests that mating and spawning most likely takes place towards the northernmost limits of the species distribution in this area. Spermatophores are obvious in males which have attained a mantle length of 260 mm while those at 320 mm mantle length bear formed spermatophores. The smallest mature female recorded having eggs in the oviduct was measured with a mantle length of 380 mm. Studies in South African waters indicate a similarly extended spawning period running from February to August. In addition, data gathered on specimens sampled from stomachs of commercially whaled sperm whales off Durban suggest that Antarctic flying squid breed off the southeast African coast. Like most members of the Ommastrephidae growth is rapid and the life cycle is completed in one year, although little is known about the early life stages of this species, with the females growing faster than the males. Both this species and the Angolan flying squid grow faster in cooler water than they do in warmer temperatures.

This species preys on fishes, crustaceans and cephalopods. Smaller squids have crustaceans as the predominant element in their diet while larger squid, larger than 200mm mantle length, feed mainly on cephalopods. This species is also preyed upon by several fish species, sea birds and marine mammals, up to the size of sperm whales. The adult Antarctic flying squids may bear large parasite loads of encysted nematodes and cestodes in their mantle tissue.

== Fisheries ==
This species has been targeted by commercial fisheries in the Falkland Islands and the Tasman Sea and is currently taken as a bycatch in fisheries pursuing other species. Its abundance and muscular flesh suggest it could be a viable commercial species.
