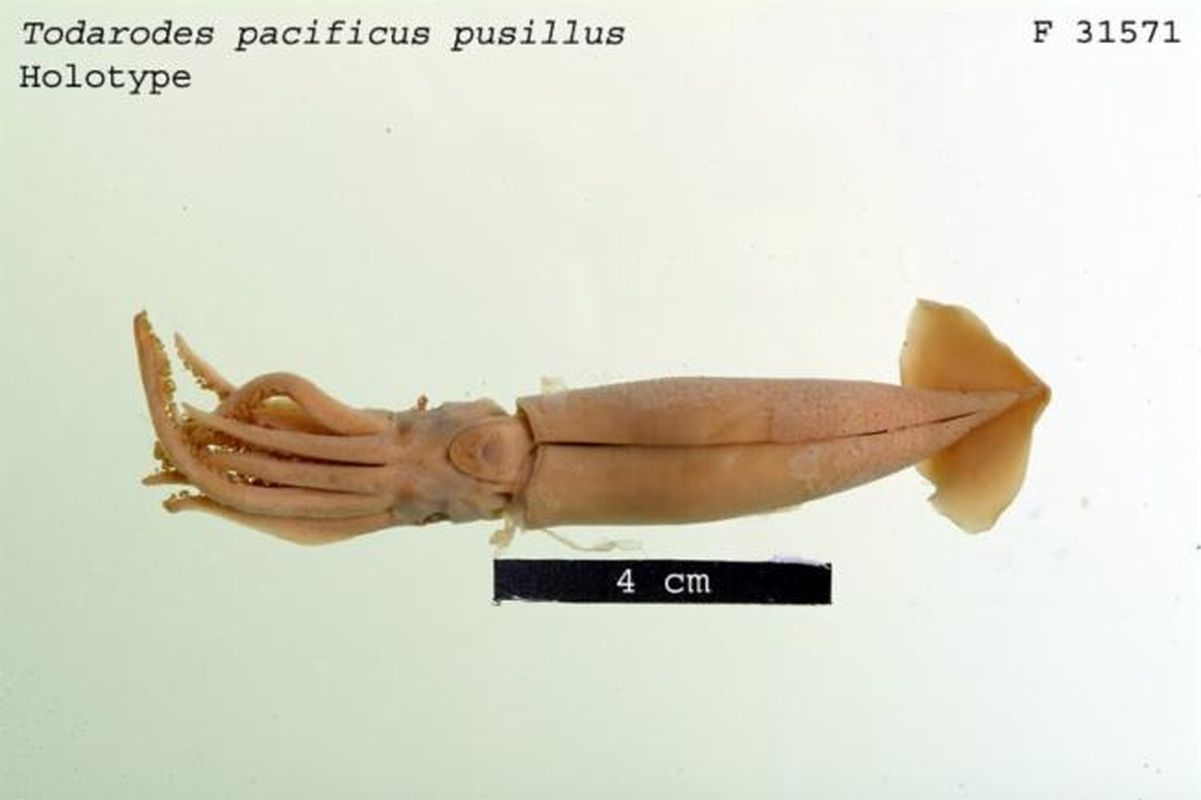
- Holotype of Todarodes pusillus
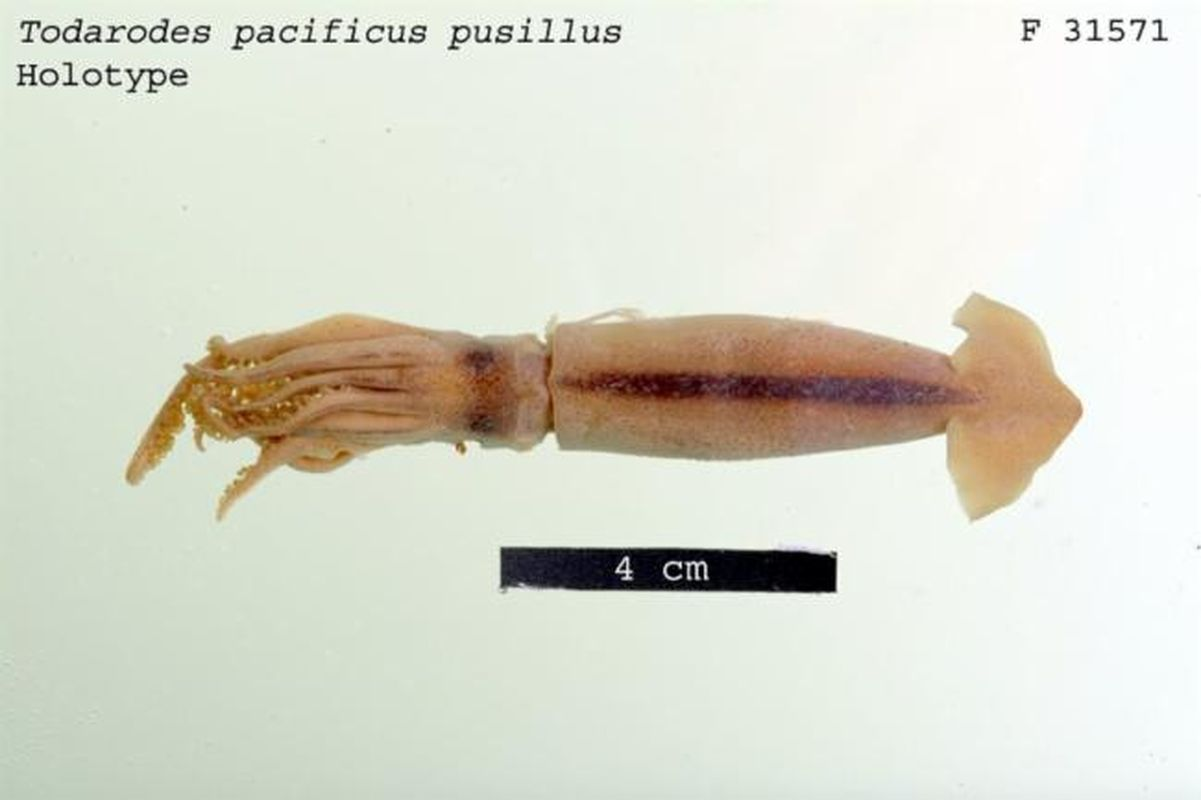

Scientific classification
- Kingdom: Animalia
- Phylum: Mollusca
- Class: Cephalopoda
- Order: Oegopsida
- Family: Ommastrephidae
- Subfamily: Todarodinae
- Genus: Todarodes
- Species: T. pusillus

Binomial name
- Todarodes pusillus (Dunning, 1988)

Synonyms
- Todarodes pacificus pusillus Dunning, 1988

= Little flying squid =

Species of squid

The little flying squid (Todarodes pusillus) is a species of squid, one of the arrow squids of the genus Todarodes, in the subfamily Todarodinae of the flying squid family Ommastrephidae. It is a small species from the waters around northern Australia and Indonesia.

== Description ==
The little flying squid is said to be dwarf species of flying squid compared to the other species of Todarodes, the largest female recorded to date had a mantle length of 74mm and the largest male measured 68mm mantle. The maximum mantle length is not thought to exceed 100mm, compared to 500mm for the Japanese flying squid. It also has relatively small fins which only have a length equivalent to 25 to 31% of the mantle length (35-40% in the Japanese flying squid). It has a cylindrical, muscular body, typical of related species, which tapers to a short, pointed tail.

Its fourth right arm bears a hectocotylus on the distal half and has 11-13 normal suckers on its basal portion, ventral trabeculae which are broadened and joined forming low serrated fan with approximately 20 pairs of trabeculae. The second and third arms on each side are longer than the first and fourth arms being slightly less than half of the mantle length. The largest arm suckers have 9-11 sharp different sized teeth on distal two thirds of their rings. The height of the protective membrane on the arms is uniform and it is not higher than that of the suckers. The manus of the tentacles has 6-8 sucker rows in four series and the rings of the medial suckers on the manus have 16-18 moderately large, subconical teeth which alternate with low plates and are around 2.5 times largers than the marginal suckers in diameter. On the tentacles the protective membranes extends to the carpal region, its height never exceeds the sucker height and it has weak supports.

== Distribution ==
The little flying squid is found in northern Australia where it occurs in the regions of the continental shelf and upper continental slope. Its distribution extends from the Timor Sea and along the eastern coast of Australia from the Torres Strait south to waters off Brisbane. It has also been recorded in a narrow band extending north from the Timor Sea through the Indonesian archipelago to Mindanao in the southern Philippines.

== Habitat and biology ==
The little flying squid's biology is not well known. All specimens caught to date have been caught at depths of between 78m and 357m where the water temperature at depths of 50m was greater than 23 °C and that at the surface could reach 29 °C in the summer. A single trawl has caught up to 54 individuals which suggests that this species forms schools. Any females caught which are larger than 60 mm mantle length have all been sexually mature, with eggs present in their oviducts and all males with mantle lengths greater than 50mm bore mature spermatophores.

== Taxonomy ==
The little flying squid has been considered to be a subspecies of the Japanese flying squid but distinct differences are evident between the two taxa. More analysis, both morphological and molecular, is required to clarify their relationships. There are specimens from Hong Kong, Taiwan and the Philippines which were described intermediate in some characters between the nominate form and the taxon treated here as Todarodes pusillus. The smaller size and rapid gaining of sexual maturity in this taxa may be a result of living at higher temperatures than the related temperate form.
