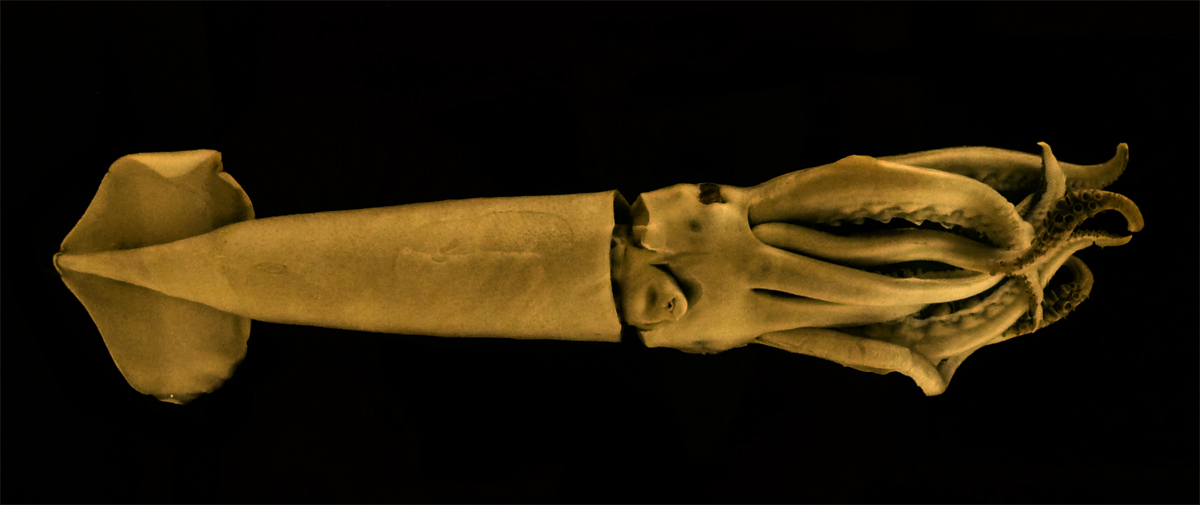
- Illex coindetii
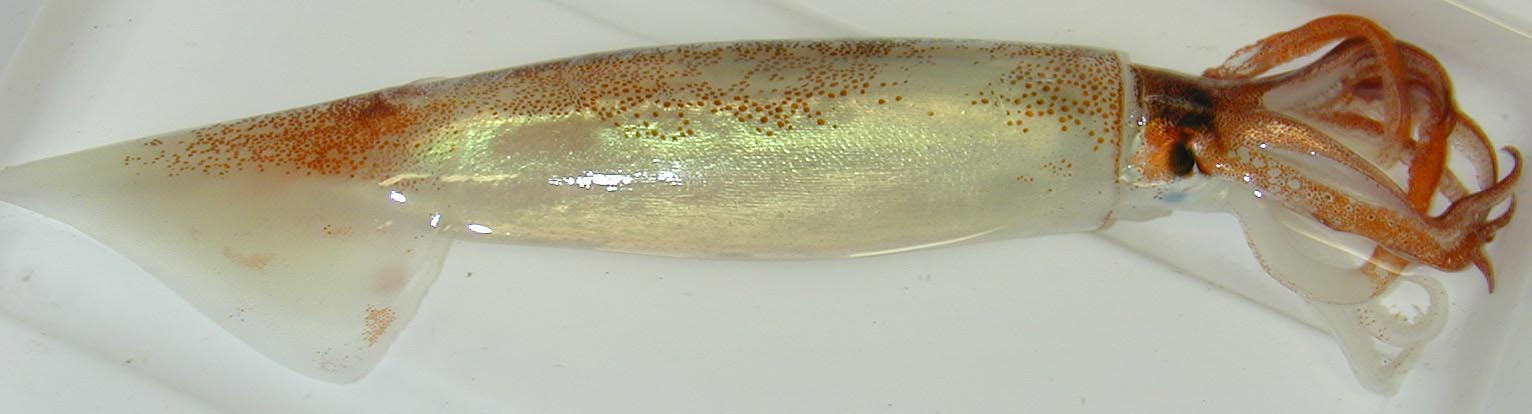
- Illex illecebrosus

Scientific classification
- Kingdom: Animalia
- Phylum: Mollusca
- Class: Cephalopoda
- Order: Oegopsida
- Family: Ommastrephidae
- Subfamily: Illicinae; Posselt, 1890
- Genus: Illex; Steenstrup, 1880

Type species
- Loligo illecebrosa Lesueur, 1821

Species
- See text

= Illex =

Genus of squids

Illex, commonly known as shortfin squids, is a genus of squid in the family Ommastrephidae and the only member of the subfamily Illicinae. It contains four species:

- Illex argentinus, Argentine shortfin squid
- Illex coindetii, southern shortfin squid
- Illex illecebrosus, northern shortfin squid
- Illex oxygonius, sharptail shortfin squid

== Systematics ==
A 2006 study evaluated the taxonomy of the squid genus Illex using molecular data from the cytochrome c oxidase subunit I (COI) gene. Traditionally, the genus has included four recognized species: Illex illecebrosus, Illex coindetii, Illex oxygonius, and Illex argentinus. I. argentinus is the most morphologically distinct and occurs in the South Atlantic Ocean, while the three North Atlantic species overlap geographically and display significant morphological variability, making them difficult to distinguish based on physical characteristics alone.

The molecular analysis revealed four distinct genetic clades within Illex, supporting the existence of four separate species. However, the study also found mismatches between some specimens' traditional morphological identifications and their genetic groupings, particularly among the North Atlantic species. This suggests that current morphological traits are not always reliable for identifying Illex species and that a combination of genetic and morphological data is needed to accurately resolve their taxonomy.

== Biology ==
Illex squids are active carnivorous predators. They use their specialized arms and tentacles, which are equipped with suckers, to capture prey. These squids employ a combination of ambush and active hunting strategies, often utilizing stealth and camouflage to blend into their surroundings. Their large eyes enable them to detect prey, primarily small fish such as herring and sand lance, as well as crustaceans like krill and shrimp.

Illex squids are opportunistic feeders, adjusting their diet based on the availability of prey in their environment. They primarily feed at night, often coming to shallower waters for hunting. Once prey is captured, the squid uses its sharp beak and radula to break down the food before digestion. Overall, Illex squids are nocturnal hunters that rely on speed, stealth, and efficient feeding mechanisms to secure prey in a variety of marine habitats.

=== Reproduction ===
One of the arms in male Illex is hectocotylized, which is a distinguishing trait of the genus. "Huge gelatinous spheres" found in the North Atlantic and Mediterranean were identified through genetic analysis as the egg masses of Illex coindetii; these measure around 0.5 to 1 m (1 ft 8 in to 3 ft 3 in) in diameter. Larger egg masses may belong to other species of Ommastrephidae. The function of these gelatinous egg masses, produced by the female's nidamental gland, is to prevent the eggs from sinking, and to keep them within areas of optimal environmental condition, such as temperature. Dispersal of the paralarvae is also thought to be a factor, along with protection from predators and parasites. Hatchlings are 2 mm long.
