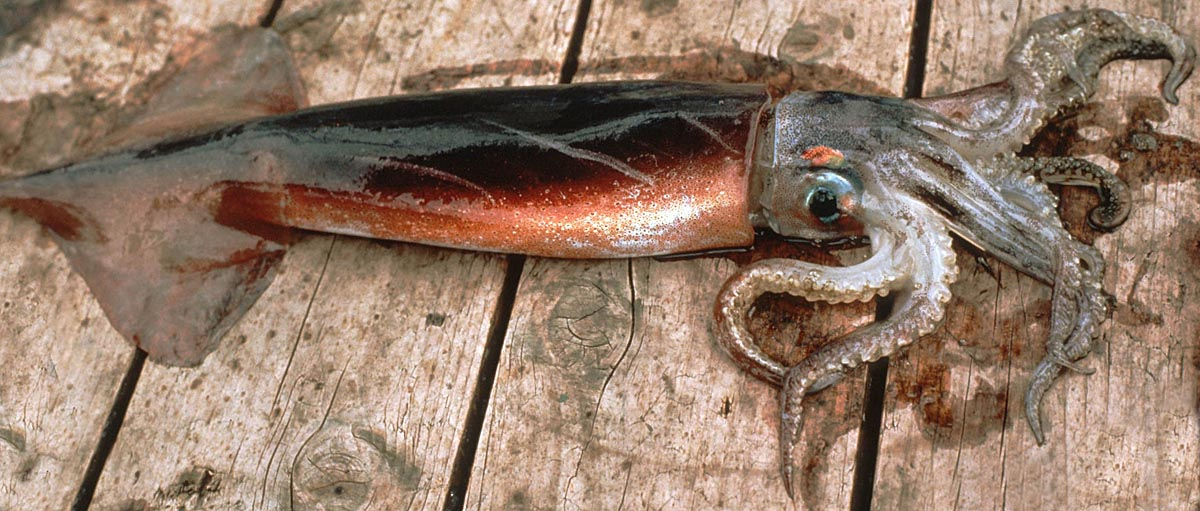

Conservation status
- Least Concern (IUCN 3.1)

Scientific classification
- Kingdom: Animalia
- Phylum: Mollusca
- Class: Cephalopoda
- Order: Oegopsida
- Family: Ommastrephidae
- Subfamily: Todarodinae
- Genus: Martialia; Rochebrune and Mabille, 1889
- Species: M. hyadesii

Binomial name
- Martialia hyadesii Rochebrune and Mabille, 1889

Synonyms
- Martialia hyadesi

= Martialia =

Martialia hyadesii

Species of squid

Martialia is a genus of flying squids in the family Ommastrephidae. It is monotypic, being represented by the single species Martialia hyadesii, commonly known as the sevenstar flying squid. It has a maximum mantle length of 400 mm (16 in), although it is typically 350 mm (14 in), with a body weighing up to 820 g (29 oz).

== Distribution ==
M. hyadesii occurs in epipelagic and mesopelagic waters of the Southern Ocean. Its range may be circumpolar with a Sub-Antarctic distribution.

== Ecology ==
These large squid are known to prey upon deep-sea ridgeheads and other mesopelagic fish, and to be preyed upon in turn by seals, king penguins and albatrosses.
