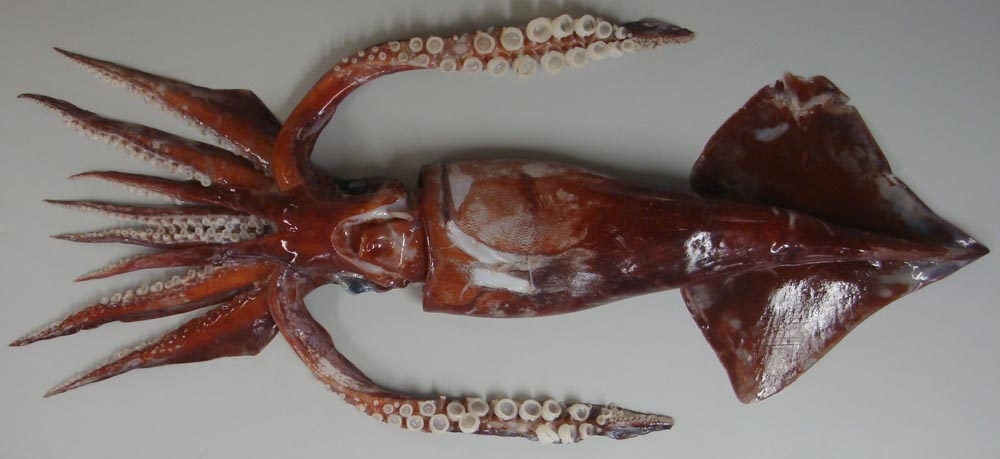
- Todarodes filippovae

Scientific classification
- Kingdom: Animalia
- Phylum: Mollusca
- Class: Cephalopoda
- Order: Oegopsida
- Family: Ommastrephidae
- Subfamily: Todarodinae
- Genus: Todarodes; Steenstrup, 1880

Type species
- Loligo sagittata Lamarck, 1798

= Todarodes =

Genus of squids

Todarodes is a genus of flying squid from the subfamily Todarodinae, of which it is the type genus. The genus contains five species which are partially allopatric but between them their distributions encompass most of the world's oceans and seas. These squid have a funnel groove with foveola, a hectocotylised fourth arm and tentacular stalks which lack free trabeculae.

== Species ==
The following species are members of Todarodes, with their vernacular names:

- Todarodes angolensis Adam, 1962 Angolan flying squid
- Todarodes filippovae Adam, 1975 Antarctic flying squid
- Todarodes pacificus (Steenstrup, 1880) Japanese flying squid
- Todarodes pusillus Dunning, 1988 little flying squid
- Todarodes sagittatus (Lamarck, 1798) European flying squid
