= Illex argentinus =

Argentine shortfin squid
- Illex argentinus illustration.

Conservation status
- Least Concern (IUCN 3.1)

Scientific classification
- Kingdom: Animalia
- Phylum: Mollusca
- Class: Cephalopoda
- Order: Oegopsida
- Family: Ommastrephidae
- Genus: Illex
- Species: I. argentinus

Binomial name
- Illex argentinus (Castellanos, 1960)

Synonyms
- Ommastrephes argentinus Castellanos, 1960

Species of cephalopod known as the Argentine shortfin squid

Illex argentinus, commonly known as the Argentine shortfin squid, is a species of squid in the family Ommastrephidae from the south western Atlantic Ocean.

It is one of the most commercially fished species of squid, with 511,087 tons harvested in 2002, or 23.3% of the entire squid harvest.

I. argentinus is most prevalent along the coasts of South America, in Argentina, Brazil and in the Falkland Islands (Malvinas) in the Patagonian shelf. Some of the largest fisheries in the world are along these coasts, capturing millions of pounds of these shortfin squid a year.

Although they are relatively small species, they tend to form shoals, making them easy to be caught by fisheries.

== Physical features ==
The Argentine shortfin squid has a relatively strong mantle and fins. Its arms are long, with male arms significantly longer than female arms.

== Habitat ==
Argentine shortfin squid can live in a variety of depths, ranging from the surface all the way to 800 m. Although the Argentine shortfin squid has a wide geographic distribution, it is an oceanic species, as they aggregate on the sea floor. They feed on other species of squid, pelagic crustaceans and crabs, shrimp, and other small fish. Throughout the lifetime of an Argentine shortfin squid, many different prey of different sizes are eaten. On the other hand, predators of the Argentine shortfin squid include marine mammals, fishes, and birds. Predators and prey depend on the geographic location of the species of the Argentine shortfin squid, as they are a migratory species. The wide variety of prey and predators reflects this. During the fall and winter months, the Argentine shortfin squid is abundant on the lower shelf of the sea, at a depth of about 200 m.

== Life history ==
Argentine shortfin squids reproduce through internal fertilization. During the mating season, which lasts throughout the summer, they lay thousands of eggs on the sea floor. The eggs develop at different rates, so they do not all hatch together. They have a relatively short life span, living up to 1–2 years. The Argentine shortfin squid migrates between spawning grounds, feeding grounds, and back during their one-year life cycle. Mature squid like to migrate northward to spawning grounds, travelling closer to sea floor at night and by the surface during the day. This squid is small, starting at only one millimeter and growing to a maximum body length of approximately one foot, while its tentacles are 9 inches long. After the Argentine shortfin squid reproduces once, it dies.

== Industrial use ==
Global capture production of Argentine shortfin squid (Illex argentinus) in million tonnes from 1975 to 2022, as reported by the FAO

It is one of the planet's most economically significant invertebrate species. As many as 2.2 billion pounds of Argentine shortfin squid have been captured in only one fishing season. From 1988 to 2003 about 700,000 tons of Argentine shortfin squid were captured. Argentine shortfin squid are so important as they make up the second largest fishery in the world by weight.

Fisheries use bright lights to attract the squid to the surface at night, and then capture them with large nets. Fisheries additionally use both trawlers and jigging vessels to capture the shortfin squid. Although so many Argentine shortfin squid are removed from the coasts every year, populations bounce back, probably because of their short lifespan. They are thus labeled a species of least concern. That being said, however, since 2010 stocks have steadily been declining. It is suggested that environmental changes instead of fishery impacts have caused this decline. It is essential that the nations that house this species must cooperate in order to ensure that the species is used by fisheries in a sustainable manner.
