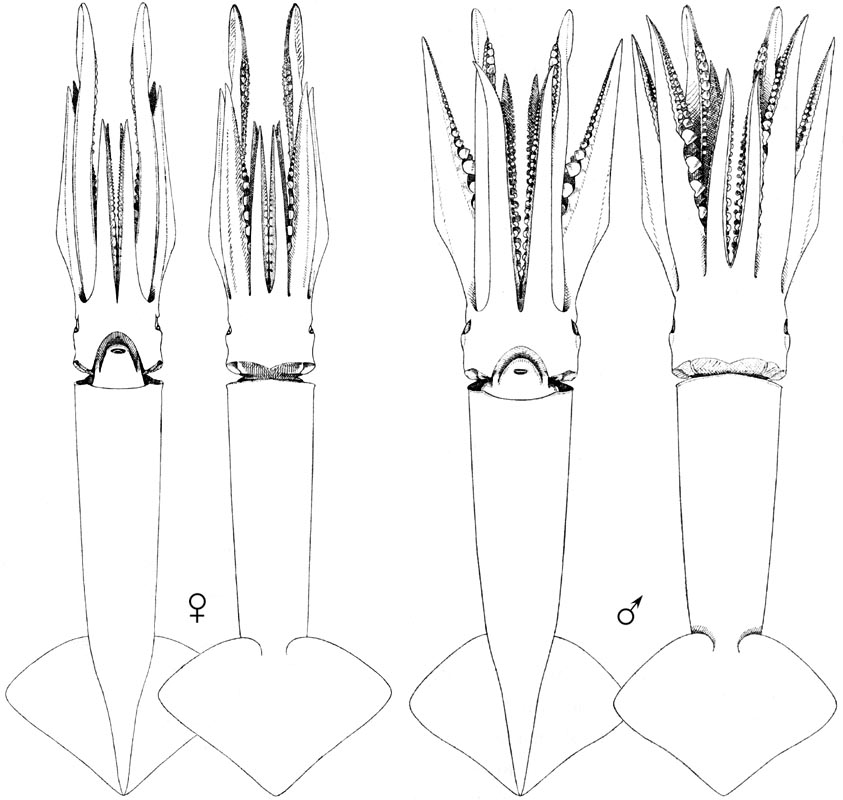
- Dorsal and ventral view of an Illex coindetii immature female (left) and mature male (right)
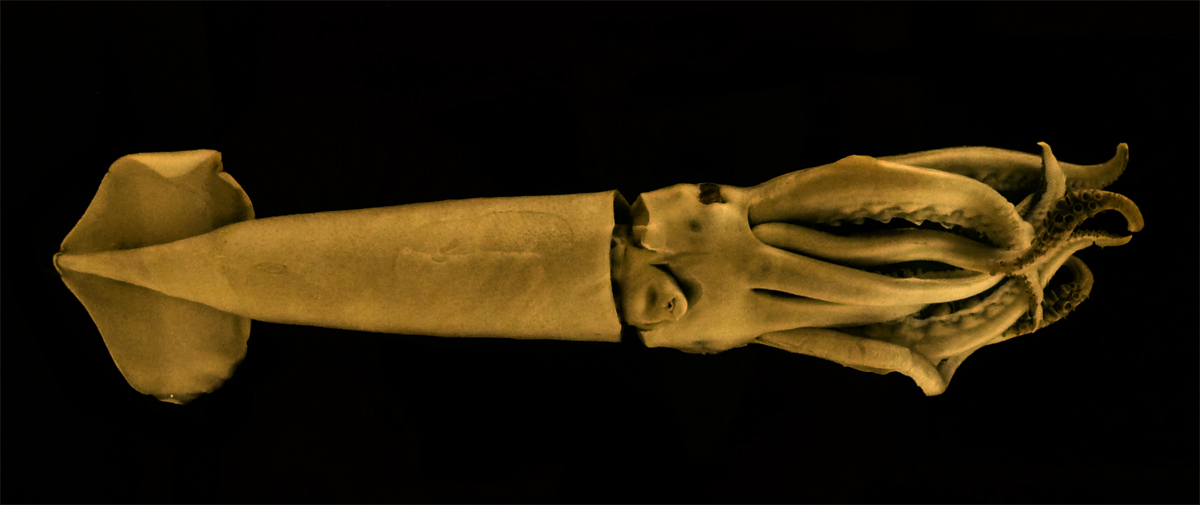
- A preserved specimen of Illex coindetii

Conservation status
- Least Concern (IUCN 3.1)

Scientific classification
- Kingdom: Animalia
- Phylum: Mollusca
- Class: Cephalopoda
- Order: Oegopsida
- Family: Ommastrephidae
- Genus: Illex
- Species: I. coindetii

Binomial name
- Illex coindetii (Vérany, 1837)

Synonyms
- Illex illecebrosus Steenstrup, 1880; Loligo coindetii Vérany, 1839; Loligo pillae Vérany, 1851

= Illex coindetii =

Southern shortfin squid Illex coindetii

Species of squid

Illex coindetii, commonly known as the southern shortfin squid or broadtail shortfin squid, is a species of neritic squids in the family Ommastrephidae. They are found in the Mediterranean Sea and on both sides of the north Atlantic Ocean.

== Description ==
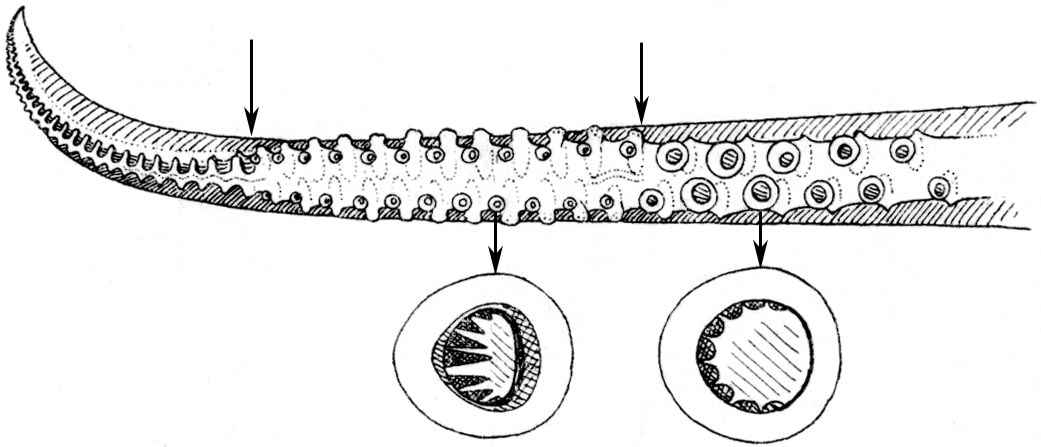
The hectocotylus of a male Illex coindetii showing closeups of two suckers. The arrows at the top mark the boundaries between the proximal, middle, and distal portions of the hectocotylus.

Mature specimens of Illex coindetii from different populations can vary significantly in both size and form. They are sexually dimorphic, with females being typically larger than males. The maximum recorded mantle length is 32 cm (13 in) in males and 37 cm (15 in) in females. These unusually large specimens, however, are not typical of the species. The average mantle length is 18 to 20 cm (7.1 to 7.9 in) in males and 25 to 27 cm (9.8 to 10.6 in) in females.

The eight arms bear two rows of suckers with teeth. In males, the longest of the arms is about 55 to 90% of the total mantle length, while it is 48 to 57% in females. The tentacles have eight longitudinal rows of suckers on the dactylus of the tentacular clubs. The largest middle suckers on the tip are also notched on the rim farthest from the body or all around. In males, the fourth left or right arm develops into a secondary sexual organ known as the hectocotylus. It is of equal length or shorter than the undeveloped opposite arm and of the same diameter. The suckers on the distal third of the hectocotylus are lost and replaced with lamella-like flaps and conical papillae. The upper part of the beak (rostrum) has a long and robust hood, smooth shoulder and short wings. The lower beak has a straight and long jaw edge and wide and long wings with no lobes.

The mantle is cylindrical with a width 15 to 25% of the mantle length. It is widest in the front region except in gravid females. The funnel–mantle locking apparatus (cartilaginous structure connecting the funnel to the mantle) is T-shaped, a characteristic of all ommastrephid squids. The funnel groove (depression on the bottom front part of the mantle where the funnel rests) is smooth and lacks foveola (pockets of skin found in ommastrephid squids of the subfamily Ommastrephinae). The fins are rhomboidal in shape, with a width of around 45 to 60% of the mantle length.

Like other members of the genus, Illex coindetii lacks photophores (bioluminescent structures).

== Taxonomy ==
The species was first described as Loligo coindetii by the French naturalist Jean Baptiste Vérany in 1837, from a specimen recovered from the Mediterranean Sea in Nice, France.

Illex coindetii is one of the four species currently recognized under the genus Illex. The genus is the only member of the subfamily Illicinae in the commercially important squid family Ommastrephidae. Populations can vary in form and size considerably, but two consistent morphotypes have been tentatively identified between specimens from the Mediterranean and the Atlantic. Despite the wide distribution range of Illex coindetii and its highly variable morphology, a 1998 study confirmed that Illex coindetii is indeed a single species.

== Distribution and habitat ==
Illex coindetii is the most widespread species in the genus Illex. They can be found in the Mediterranean Sea and on both sides of the North Atlantic Ocean, from as far north as the Bristol Channel to as far south as the Gulf of Mexico and along the coasts of Venezuela, Suriname and Namibia. They have also been reported from the Red Sea, but it is likely that the specimens in question were misidentified. Newer studies suggest a new and rising population in the North Sea, benefiting from overfishing and acceleration of their life cycles by rising sea temperatures.

Illex coindetii are neritic, oceanic, and benthic species. They can usually be found at depths of 200 to 600 m (660 to 1,970 ft) from the surface in the western Atlantic, 150 to 300 m (490 to 980 ft) in the eastern Atlantic, 180 to 450 m (590 to 1,480 ft) in the Caribbean, and 60 to 400 m (200 to 1,310 ft) in the Mediterranean. The maximum recorded depth they have been recovered is about 1,000 m (3,300 ft).

== Ecology and biology ==
Illex coindetii inhabit muddy, sandy, and silty bottoms often in association with sea pens of the genus Funiculina. Larger and smaller individuals are more often found in deeper and shallower waters respectively, but otherwise the adults and juveniles share the same depth range. Some populations have been observed to exhibit migration into shallower waters during spring and deeper waters in the winter. Illex coindetii also exhibit diel vertical migration, daily movements in which the squids stay in deeper waters during the day and move up the water column during night.

The dominant prey of Illex coindetii includes fish, crustaceans (particularly krill in some populations), and other cephalopods. Occasional prey include arrow worms and tunicates. They are known to engage in cannibalism.

The ratio between males and females in Illex coindetii is roughly 1:1. The species spawns throughout the year, though seasonal peaks have been observed in spring and summer in some areas. Males produce from 81 to 1,555 spermatophores, varying in length between 1.4 and 3.8 cm (0.55 and 1.50 in). Larger males produce a greater amount and larger-sized spermatophores. Females may mate more than once and it is estimated that they contain a maximum of 800,000 eggs (both mature and immature) in their ovaries.

Eggs have been observed in buoyant gelatinous spheres averaging one meter in diameter. Each egg is around 0.8 to 1.3 mm (0.031 to 0.051 in) in diameter. They hatch 10 to 14 days after being laid. The paralarvae are active swimmers and have a mantle length of up to 1.4 mm (0.055 in). Like other members of the family Ommastrephidae, the paralarvae exhibit distinctive fused tentacles called the "proboscis". It is characteristically 50 to 75% of the mantle lengths of the paralarvae. The proboscis begins to divide into the pair of tentacles once the paralarvae reach a mantle length of 4 mm (0.16 in).

== Importance ==
Illex coindetii is one of the two squid species most frequently fished for human consumption in the northeastern and central Atlantic (particularly in Spain and Portugal), the other species being the lesser flying squid (Todaropsis eblanae). In the Mediterranean, they constitute an important by-catch of the fishing industry in Sicily, along with the European flying squid (Todarodes sagittatus).
