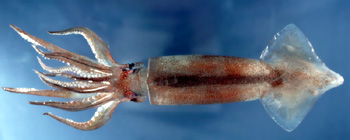
- Dorsal view
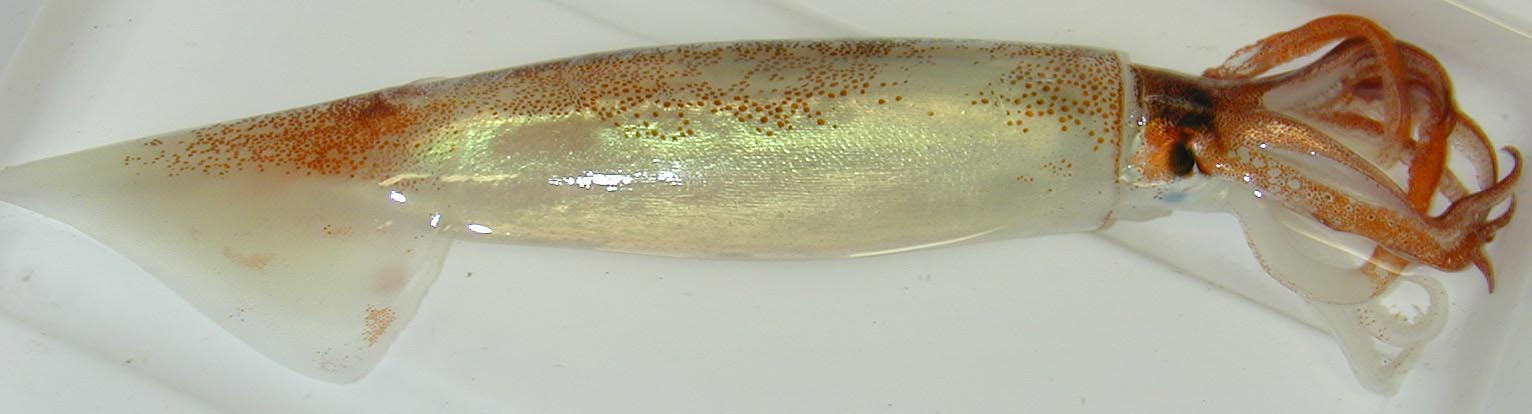
- Lateral view

Conservation status
- Least Concern (IUCN 3.1)

Scientific classification
- Kingdom: Animalia
- Phylum: Mollusca
- Class: Cephalopoda
- Order: Oegopsida
- Family: Ommastrephidae
- Genus: Illex
- Species: I. illecebrosus

Binomial name
- Illex illecebrosus (Lesueur, 1821)

Synonyms
- Loligo illecebrosa Lesueur, 1821; Loligo piscatorum La Pylaie, 1825; Ommastrephes illecebrosus Verrill, 1880

= Illex illecebrosus =

Northern shortfin squid Illex illecebrosus

Species of cephalopod known as the northern shortfin squid

Illex illecebrosus, commonly known as the northern shortfin squid, is a species of neritic squids in the family Ommastrephidae. Squids of the genus Illex account for 65% of the world's cephalopod captures. Illex is formed by four taxa distributed throughout the Atlantic Ocean (I. argentinus, I. coindetii, I. illecebrosus and I. oxygonius), whose identification and phylogenetic relationships based on morphological characters remain controversial. They are found in the northwest Atlantic Ocean, from off the coast of eastern North America to Greenland, Iceland, and west of Ireland and the United Kingdom. They are a highly migratory and short-lived species, with lifespans of less than a year. They are commercially important and are fished extensively (primarily by the United States and Canada), mostly for the Canadian and Japanese markets.

Northern shortfin squid is a migratory species of squid with a distribution ranging from Florida Straits to Newfoundland in the Northwest Atlantic Ocean. The species is native to Canada, Greenland, Iceland and United States. The species has an average lifespan between 1–1.5 years in which most live less than a year. The location of the fishery of the squid is mainly in Mid-Atlantic Bight from between summer and fall.

== Description ==
Northern shortfin squid is a moderately-sized squid with females ranging from 20 to 30 centimetres (7.9 to 11.8 inches) in mantle length while males are generally smaller with mantle length ranging from 18 to 27 cm (7.1 to 10.6 in). Northern shortfin squid has short tentacles with a long and narrow head which is connected to the long mantle. The fins are shorter in length parallel to the mantle yet the length of the fins perpendicular to the mantle are about twice the length. The squid is reddish brown to purple in color and there is higher opacity in the head and mantle while the rest of the body are yellowish green tinted.

== Migration & distribution ==
Northern shortfin squid migrate from boreal and temperate waters to subtropical waters where they travel as far as 1,000 miles. The species is highly migratory as there are seasonal distribution patterns. The range of the species is between 66°N and 29°N where they are distributed in central Florida, Newfoundland and Labrador Spaws in South of Cape Hatteras to central Florida. They settle in oceanic and neritic zone of the ocean. There is high abundance of the species in Newfoundland and New Jersey.

== Diet and feeding ==
The species mainly feeds on fish and crustaceans but it undergoes a shift from a crustacean dominated diet to a mainly fish diet. It feeds at night near the upper layers of water. Like other species of squid, cannibalism also occurs in smaller squids by larger squids. Based on the commercial catch of squid in Newfoundland in 1979, it was found that most squid prey on fish that are valuable for the market. The species feeds on many species of fish including Atlantic cod, hake, capelin, etc., in which their otoliths are found in the squid's stomach.

== Reproduction and growth ==
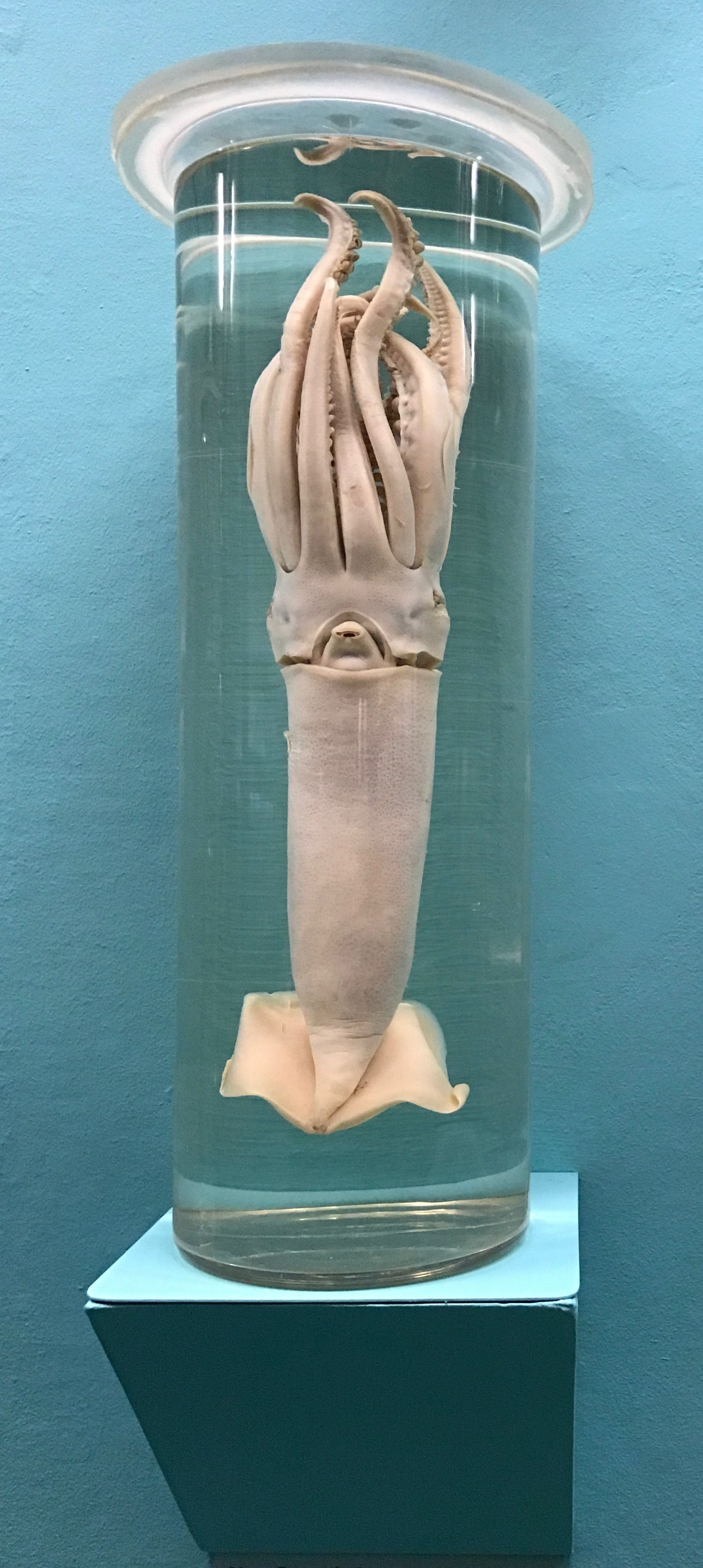
Ilex illecebrosus

Spawning season for northern shortfin squid happens all year round. There are higher chances for the species to survive recruitment when it is spawned in the winter season because of the condition provided being optimal for the growth which supports the ability for the squid to perform spawning migration. The months for hatching range from June to December where it is more prevalent in July, August, September, October and November. It is found that sex does not affect the growth rate of the total body mass yet the month of hatching affects the growth rate to increase. Females grow faster compared to males and there is a linear relationship in the growth rate of the squid in which there is a swift growth measured by the increase of mantle length. Even so, the condition of the habitat also affects the differing growth rate of both sexes as male grow faster than females in Newfoundland and Nova Scotian waters. Juveniles range from the size of 34 to 66 mm (1.3 to 2.6 in) while adults may reach up to 35 cm (14 in). It is found that northern shortfin squid who lives in warmer waters grow more rapidly especially in the Mid-Atlantic region.

== Predation ==
Northern shortfin squid has developed behavior such as ink jetting, schooling and camouflaging as protection to prevent predation by larger fish species such as bluefin tuna, red and silver hake. Mammals such as pilot whales and dolphins also prey on the species.
