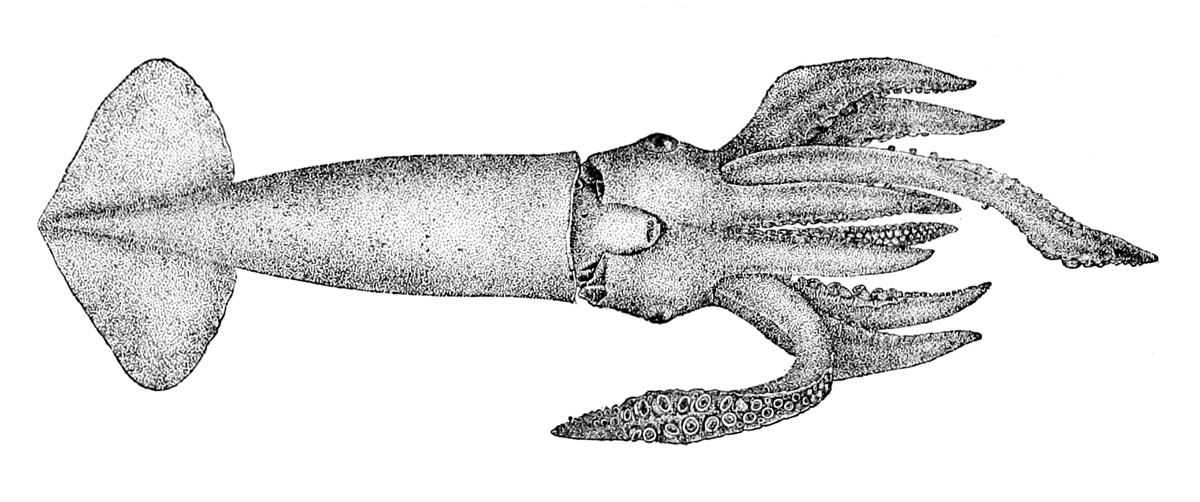

Conservation status
- Least Concern (IUCN 3.1)

Scientific classification
- Kingdom: Animalia
- Phylum: Mollusca
- Class: Cephalopoda
- Order: Oegopsida
- Family: Ommastrephidae
- Genus: Nototodarus
- Species: N. hawaiiensis

Binomial name
- Nototodarus hawaiiensis (Berry, 1912)

= Nototodarus hawaiiensis =

Hawaiian flying squid

Species of squid

Nototodarus hawaiiensis, the Hawaiian flying squid, is a species of squid. It mainly lives at depths of about 400 - 570 m. It lives in the Pacific Ocean from Hawaiian Islands to Midway Island. It is listed as a Least Concern species by the IUCN red list.
