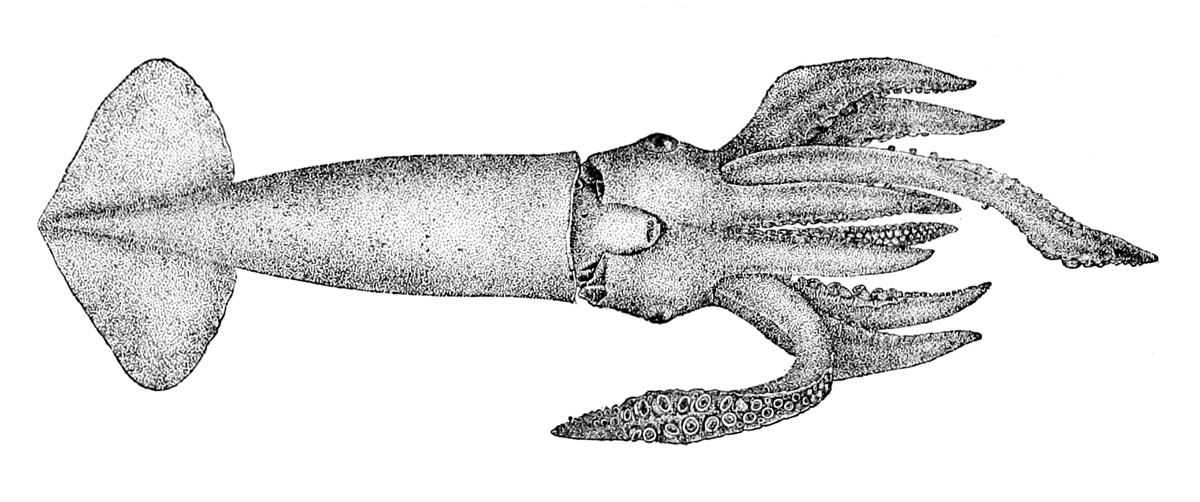
- Nototodarus hawaiiensis

Scientific classification
- Domain: Eukaryota
- Kingdom: Animalia
- Phylum: Mollusca
- Class: Cephalopoda
- Order: Oegopsida
- Family: Ommastrephidae
- Subfamily: Todarodinae
- Genus: Nototodarus; Pfeffer, 1912

Type species
- Nototodarus sloanii (Gray, 1849

Species
- Nototodarus gouldi (McCoy, 1888); Nototodarus hawaiiensis (Berry, 1912); Nototodarus sloanii (Gray, 1849)

= Nototodarus =

Genus of molluscs

Nototodarus is a genus of squid. Example species in this genus include Nototodarus sloanii, a species sought for human food. In the process of harvesting N. sloanii, Australian sea lions are frequently killed, since that marine mammal preys upon this squid species. Furthermore, New Zealand arrow squid, N. sloanii, is an important food source for the endangered yellow-eyed penguin, Megadyptes antipodes.

== Species ==
- Nototodarus gouldi (McCoy, 1888)
- Nototodarus hawaiiensis (S. S. Berry, 1912)
- Nototodarus sloanii (Gray, 1849)
