= Isolume =

Isolumes are the preferred light zone of an organism in the ocean in the preferendum hypothesis. The preferendum hypothesis suggests that some organisms living in the mesopelagic zone, change their depth as light levels change in order to remain in their isolume. Organisms prefer to remain within a certain light level for a variety of reasons. Some organisms, like Sergestidae, Euphausiid, and Palinuridae, use bioluminescence to camouflage their existence from predators and they change their depth as conditions change to stay in their isolume. Zooplankton in Arctic and Antarctic regions will remain at the same depth for months at a time due to the long winters with little to no daylight.

Organisms of the same species do not always exist in the same isolume and numerous factors can change what light levels an organism prefers to live in including age, sex, and competition for food.
