= Acoustic survey in fishing =

Acoustic survey in fishing is one of the research methods that can detect the abundance of target species using acoustic detectors. For example, many pelagic fisheries are generally very scattered over a broad ocean and difficult to detect. Hence survey vessel with acoustic detector emits sound waves to estimate the density of plankton and fish shoal. Generally, the transducer is put under water, which is linked to an echo sounder in the vessel which records the shoals of fish as "marks" on a screen or paper trace. Then the density and number of marks are converted into biomass.

One real case of acoustic survey was conducted In July 1993 to examine pre-spawning concentration of autumn-spawning herring using a Simrad EK 500 38-kHz sounder and echo-integrator in the fisheries research vessel in FRV Scotia. The survey track was set based on the limit of herring densities in previous years. A transect spacing of 15 nautical miles (17.3 miles) was used. Data from the echo integrator were summed over a 15-min period (2.5n. miles at 10 knots; 1 knot=1.852 km/h). The echo sound provided approximately 2.5*10,000,000 measurements of fish density during acoustic survey of herring population.

Acoustic survey is also used for land animals like bats for bat habitat management. Acoustic survey is conducted to find out bat occurrence and activity patterns and other emerging features on bat populations. Acoustic survey has an advantage since it can be conducted over greater spatial extents in many habitats with little cost, but drawbacks are species identification difficulty and population size counting unavailability. Despite the drawbacks, acoustic survey remains as an important tool to address many bat research monitoring.
