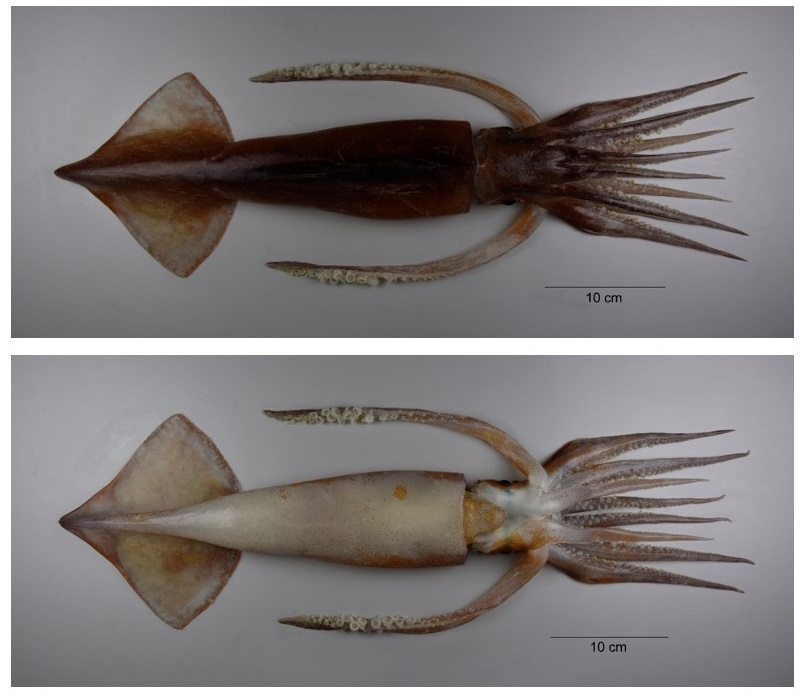
- Dorsal and ventral view of Nototodarus sloanii

Conservation status
- Least Concern (IUCN 3.1)

Scientific classification
- Kingdom: Animalia
- Phylum: Mollusca
- Class: Cephalopoda
- Order: Oegopsida
- Family: Ommastrephidae
- Subfamily: Todarodinae
- Genus: Nototodarus
- Species: N. sloanii

Binomial name
- Nototodarus sloanii (Gray, 1849)

Synonyms
- Ommastrephes sloanii Gray, 1849; Todarodes sloanei (Gray, 1849); Todarodes sloanei sloanei (Gray, 1849)

= Nototodarus sloanii =

Species of mollusc

Nototodarus sloanii is a species of squid commonly known as the New Zealand arrow squid or Wellington flying squid. It is also known by its Māori name of wheketere. It is a favoured prey species of a number of marine mammals and seabirds. It is an important food source for the New Zealand fur seal and two endangered species: the New Zealand sea lion and the yellow-eyed penguin (Megadyptes antipodes). Nototodarus sloanii is sought by trawler fishermen for human consumption; New Zealand sea lions are frequently caught in trawl nets and drowned when feeding on N. sloanii.

== Habitat ==
The species inhabits the coastal regions and the continental shelf around New Zealand to a depth of about 500 m, at a broad range of temperatures but more inclined towards colder waters.

== Description ==
The species exhibits a maximum mantle length of between 32 and 42 cm (13 and 17 in), and a maximum weight of 0.6 to 1.8 kg (1.3 to 4.0 lb) when fully grown. Growth rates are known to increase with higher temperatures. They have an orange and pink muscular mantle that tapers to a pointed tail, with a darker maroon stripe down the midline, and has a sagittate (arrowhead-shaped) marking that is 42 to 48% of the mantle length. It also has broad fins angled 40–50 degrees and eight tentacles, mainly composed of the tentacular club, with sucker rings containing 11 to 13 conical teeth with low platelets; arm sucker rings with 11–15 short teeth surrounding a central one. They use these tentacles for catching prey. There are two fins on the head of the squid that are used to siphon water in one side and push it out of the other. The mouth can be found in between the arms.

== Lifecycle ==
The peak spawning season for N. sloanii is from September to March. However, spawning occurs throughout the year for this species. The squids reproduce sexually; they have a mating ritual that can be behavioral, physical, and morphological. During this process, the male hold the female and insert their hectocotylus into the females' mantle cavity; the spermatophores are then typically found in the buccal cavities of the females, but sometimes the spermatophores are affixed to the head, arms, or dorsal mantle of the female. The male and female adults die shortly after spawning (semelparity). Embryos hatch at a planktonic stage until they grow into benthic adults that live for just over a year, and due to a high growth rate, they reach maturity at around 200 days. The arrow squid has a short lifespan, rapid growth and development, and ability to have their appearance molded. Due to this, their population is made up of new individuals each year.

At the cellular level of the arrow squid, growth occurs over their entire lifespan by excessive growth and abnormal increase in the number of cells. Arrow squids have exceptionally high growth efficiency, with a protein-based metabolism that rapidly converts energy into growth. They store very little if any of their food energy. The metabolic and growth rates of squid are very high in fact they may be as high as some mammals.

Nototodarus sloanii displays high intraspecific variability in areas such as egg size and rates of embryonic development, hatchling size, growth, age and size at maturity. Their changing appearances along with their short lifespan and rapid growth rates allows the squid to be extremely responsive to changing environmental conditions. They are also able to move over considerable distances leading to them having unpredictable and complex patterns of distribution.
