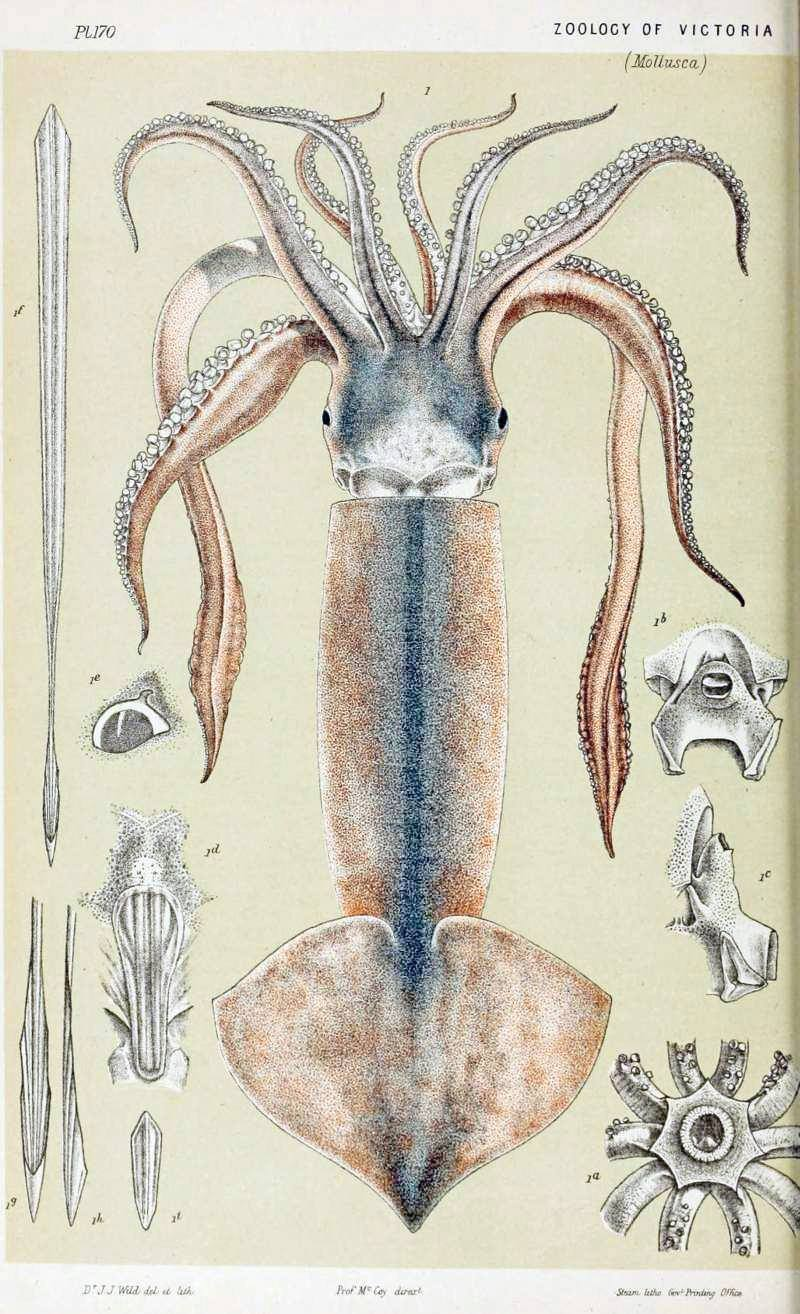

Conservation status
- Least Concern (IUCN 3.1)

Scientific classification
- Kingdom: Animalia
- Phylum: Mollusca
- Class: Cephalopoda
- Order: Oegopsida
- Family: Ommastrephidae
- Genus: Nototodarus
- Species: N. gouldi

Binomial name
- Nototodarus gouldi (McCoy, 1888)

= Gould's squid =

Species of mollusc

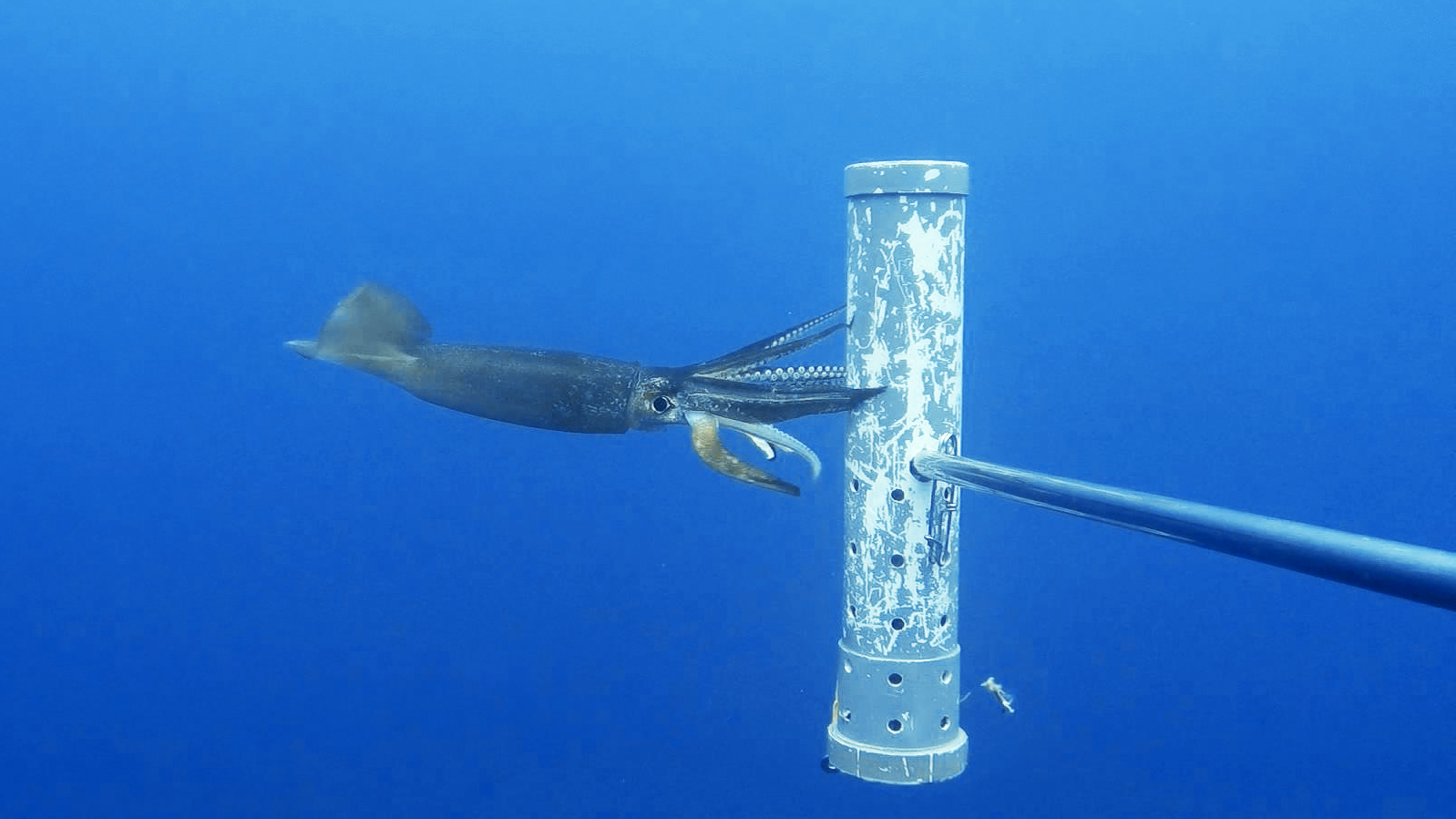
Gould's flying squid @ Bremer Marine Park

Nototodarus gouldi, also known as the Gould's squid, Gould's flying squid, or arrow squid, is a squid belonging to the family Ommastrephidae. Inhabiting the tropical and temperate waters of Australia and New Zealand, they comprise an important fishery.

== Morphology ==
N. gouldi has a mantle length of up to 40 cm (16 in), and a weight of up to 1.6 kg (3.5 lb), though they average 0.7 kg (1.5 lb). Males are smaller than females. The tentacles reach around 18 cm (7.1 in) long, or 45% of the length of the mantle. It has a pair of long feeding tentacles and four pairs of shorter tentacles at its anterior end. Its skin varies moderately in color, ranging from light pink or brown to brick red, with a dark dorsal stripe on its mantle.

== Distribution ==
The squid is typically found at depths from 50–200 m (160–660 ft) off the coasts and shelves of Australia and New Zealand, although it can go as deep as 825 metres (2,707 ft). Juveniles are sometimes found just off coasts.

== Biology and life cycle ==
Like all squid, the Gould's squid is a predator. It eats smaller fish, such as barracudas, as well as other squids, and cannibalism has sometimes been observed. Prey is caught by the tentacles, moved towards the head, and then chewed and swallowed by the sharp beak underneath the tentacles. Like many other squid, it is eaten by seabirds, large fish, sharks, and marine mammals.

At around 6 months of age, the squid becomes sexually mature. A female squid will store a spermatophore from the male inside of buccal pouches inside of her mouth. Eggs become fertilized when they pass through the mouth, and they are then released into the water as a free-floating, jelly-like goo, which hatches into young squids 1–2 months after they are released. Both genders will die shortly after they spawn, which is known as semelparity. Although a definite peak in spawning has been observed from February to March, adults can spawn at any time of the year.

== Uses and fishing ==
Gould's squid are commonly caught using jigging (as they are considered inedible if caught by trawling) and eaten in Australia and New Zealand. However, their population swings, short shelf lives, and variable size make them a difficult squid to catch. The highest catch ever (7,914 tons) was reported from Japanese fishing boats. Since then, that number has generally gone down. In 2017, a total of 828 tons of squid were reported to be caught. The cause of this decline is unclear. However, they are neither considered over-fished nor endangered.
