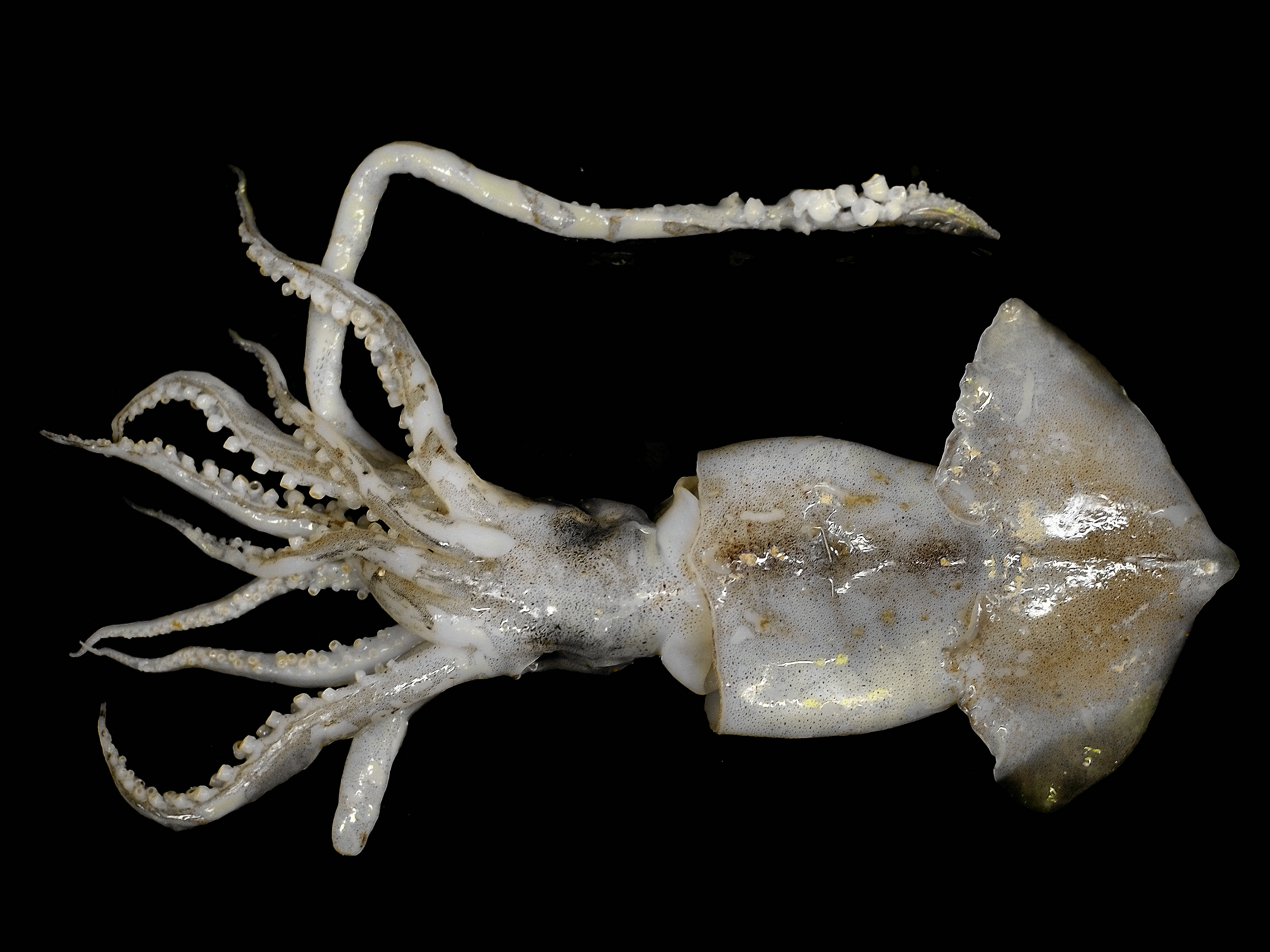

Conservation status
- Least Concern (IUCN 3.1)

Scientific classification
- Kingdom: Animalia
- Phylum: Mollusca
- Class: Cephalopoda
- Order: Oegopsida
- Family: Ommastrephidae
- Subfamily: Todaropsinae; Nigmatullin, 2000
- Genus: Todaropsis; Girard, 1890
- Species: T. eblanae

Binomial name
- Todaropsis eblanae (Ball, 1841)

Synonyms
- Loligo eblanae Ball, 1841; Todaropsis veranyi Girard, 1889; Ommastrephes veranyi (Girard, 1889)

= Todaropsis =

Species of squid

Todaropsis is a species of short finned squid in the family Ommastrephidae. It is the only genus in the monotypic subfamily Todaropsinae. The genus Todaropsis is also monotypic, containing the single species Todaropsis eblanae, also known as the lesser flying squid.

== Description ==
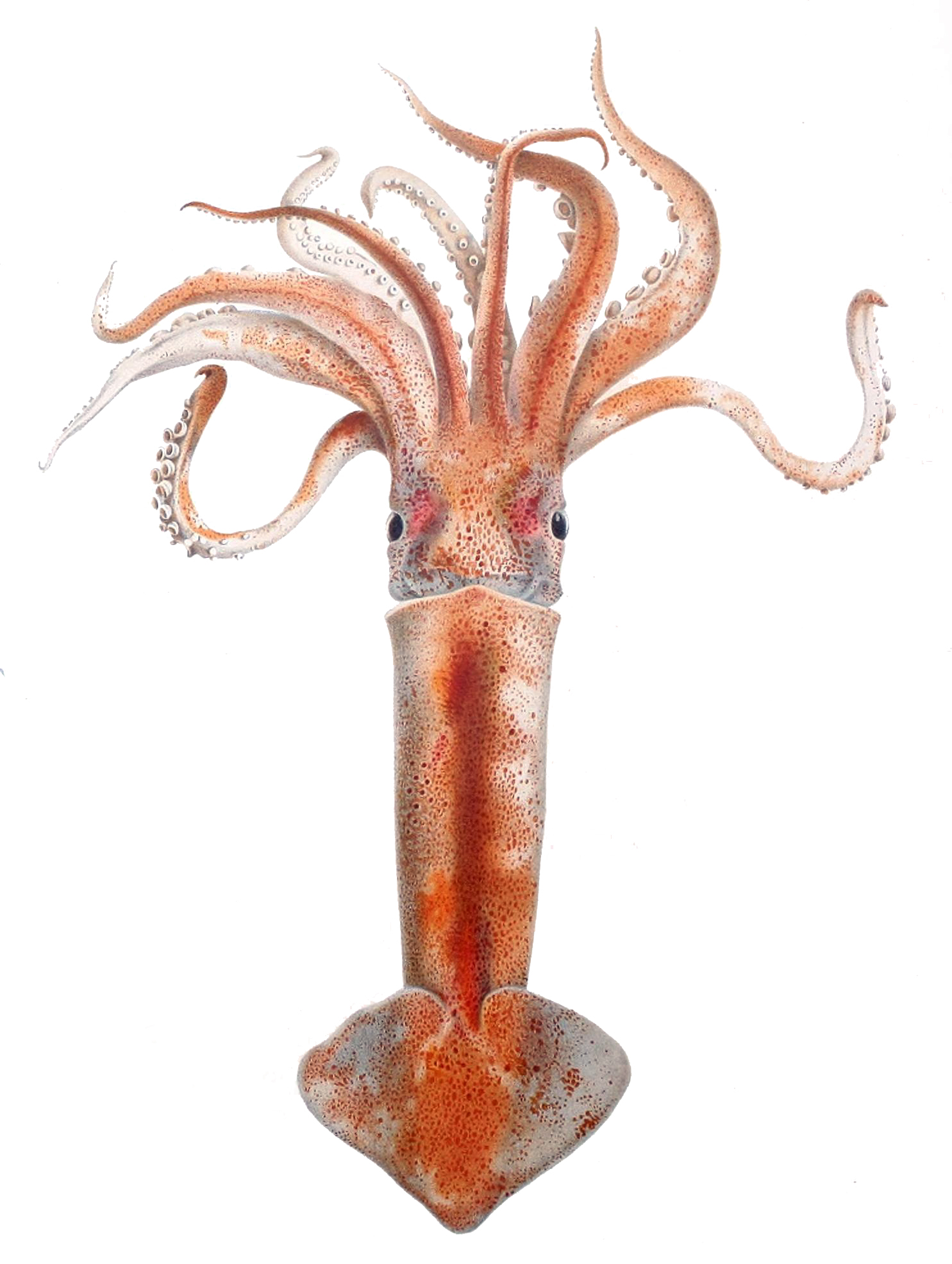
Todaropsis eblanae

Todaropsis eblanae is a relatively small-sized squid between 13–22 centimetres (5.1–8.7 in) in length with a large, broad head. The males grow to a maximum mantle length of 16.0 cm and the females to a maximum mantle length of 27 centimetres (11 in). This species possesses a terminal fin which is broadly rhomboidal, wider than it is long and posteriorly rounded. Its arms are stout, more than twice the length of head, and the tentacle club is slim, with four rows of suckers, not extending away from the tips on to the stalk.

== Habitat ==
This species is associated with muddy substrates.

== Biology ==
A total of 21 specimens were examined from examples caught in Galicia and different prey items which fell into three distinct types were found to be taken as prey by Todaropis eblanae these were bony fish, crustaceans and other cephalopods. The diet was found to be dominated by blue whiting Micromesistius poutassou, which was found to make up 43% of the prey taken. In Irish Waters Mueller's Pearlside (Maurolicus muelleri), a small mesopelagic fish, is a particularly important prey item of Todaropsis eblanae being found in and 34.7% of stomachs examined with prey remains.

In northern waters Todaropsis eblanae generally mate and spawn in the summer and early autumn months, i.e. from June through to November. Hatching occurs in late autumn through to the early spring, i.e. from October up until March, producing juveniles in the first half of the year.

== Distribution ==
Found in the eastern coastal waters of the North Atlantic and South Atlantic from Shetland to the Cape of Good Hope, and the Indian Ocean from the along the coasts of southern Africa, Madagascar and the Mascarenes north to the Timor Sea, and then along the western and south-eastern coasts of Australia.

== Fisheries ==
This squid is one of the most abundant cephalopods in the Celtic Sea, even so it is usually caught as a bycatch by trawlers fishing for other species.
