= Manus (anatomy) =

Distal portion of the forelimb of an animal

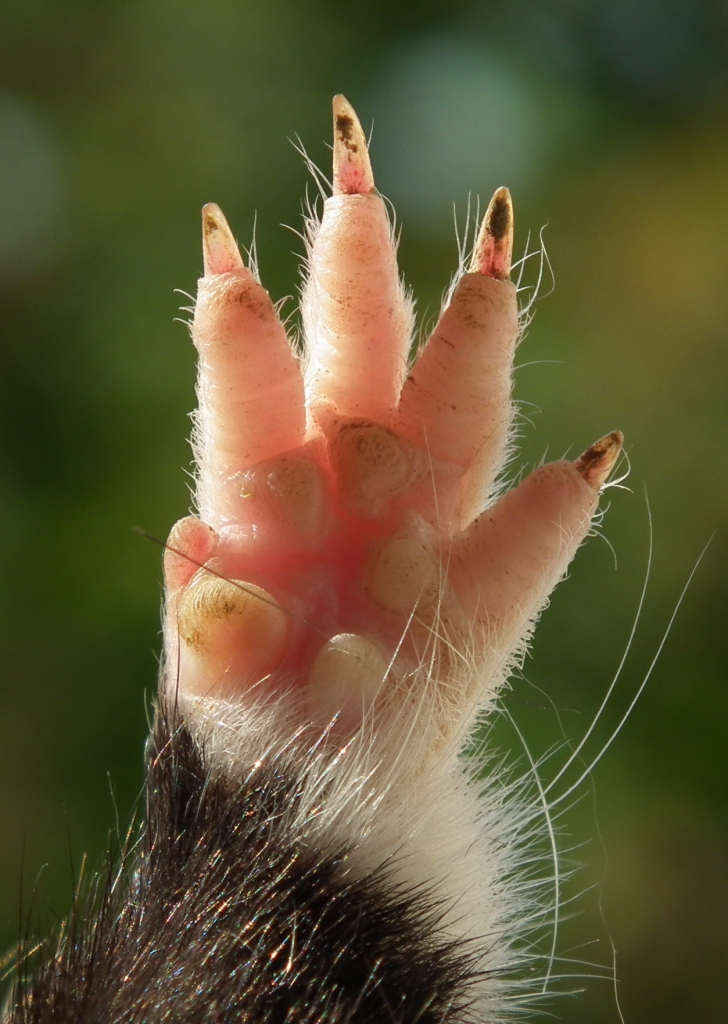
Manus of a rodent: the Eurasian hamster (Cricetus cricetus)

The manus (Latin for 'hand'; pl. manus) is the zoological term for the distal portion of the forelimb of an animal. In tetrapods, the manus is the part of the pentadactyl limb that includes the metacarpals and digits (phalanges). During evolution, the manus has taken many forms and served a variety of functions.

The manus can be represented by the hand of primates, the lower front limb of hoofed animals, or the forepaw. It is represented in the wing of birds, bats, and prehistoric flying reptiles (pterosaurs), the flipper of marine mammals, and the 'paddle' of extinct marine reptiles, such as plesiosaurs and ichthyosaurs.

In cephalopods, the manus is the end, broader part of a tentacle, and its suckers are often larger and arranged differently from those on the other arms.

== See also ==
- Pes (anatomy) – the distal portion of the hind limb of tetrapod animals
