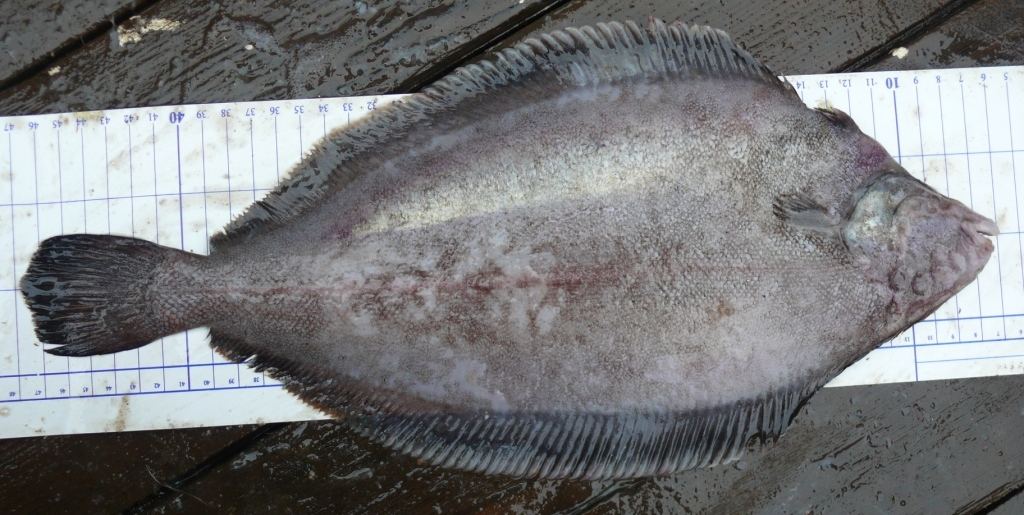

Scientific classification
- Kingdom: Animalia
- Phylum: Chordata
- Class: Actinopterygii
- Order: Carangiformes
- Suborder: Pleuronectoidei
- Family: Pleuronectidae
- Genus: Glyptocephalus
- Species: G. stelleri

Binomial name
- Glyptocephalus stelleri (P. J. Schmidt (ru), 1904)

Synonyms
- Microstomus stelleri Schmidt, 1904; Glyptocephalus ostroumowi Pavlenko, 1910; Glyptocephalus sasae Snyder, 1911; Microstomus hireguro Tanaka, 1916

= Blackfin flounder =

Species of fish

The blackfin flounder (Glyptocephalus stelleri) is a flatfish of the family Pleuronectidae. It is a demersal fish that lives in temperate waters at depths of between 8 and 1,600 metres (26 and 5,249 ft), though it is most commonly found between 15 and 800 metres (49 and 2,625 ft). Its native habitat is the northern Pacific, from the Sea of Japan to the Strait of Tartary and southern Kuril Islands and out into the Bering Sea. It grows up to 52 centimetres (20 in) in length, and can weigh up to 1.5 kilograms (3.3 lb). Maximum reported lifespan is 23 years.

== Diet ==
The blackfin flounder's diet consists of benthos invertebrates such as crustaceans, molluscs and worms.

== Atavism ==
In 2005 a blackfin flounder was caught in Peter the Great Gulf, Russia that had its eyes on the left hand side of its body and corresponding reversal of pigmentation (see Bothidae). This is the first recorded instance of this form of atavism in the blackfin flounder.
