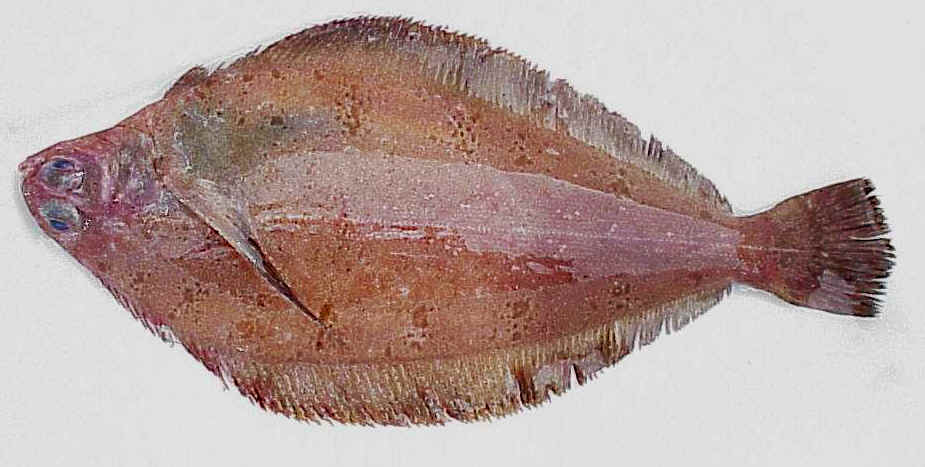

Scientific classification
- Kingdom: Animalia
- Phylum: Chordata
- Class: Actinopterygii
- Order: Carangiformes
- Suborder: Pleuronectoidei
- Family: Pleuronectidae
- Genus: Glyptocephalus
- Species: G. zachirus

Binomial name
- Glyptocephalus zachirus Lockington, 1879

Synonyms
- Errex zachirus (Lockington, 1879)

= Rex sole =

Species of fish

The rex sole (Glyptocephalus zachirus) is a flatfish of the family Pleuronectidae. Locally, it may also be known as a witch or threadfin sole (due to the filamentous pelvic fin on the eyed surface). It is a demersal fish that lives in temperate waters on sand or mud bottoms at depths of up to 900 metres (3,000 ft), though it is most commonly found between 61 and 500 metres (200 and 1,640 ft). Its native habitat is the northern Pacific, from Baja California in Mexico up the coasts of the United States, British Columbia and Alaska, across the Bering Sea to the coast of Russia and the Sea of Japan. It is slow-growing, reaching up to 60 centimetres (24 in) in length (though its average length is 36 centimetres (14 in)), and it can weigh up to 2.0 kilograms (4.4 lb). Maximum reported lifespan is 24 years.

== Description ==
The rex sole is a right-eyed flounder with an elongate, oval-shaped body and a small mouth. Its upper surface is uniform in colour, light brown to grey, with small scales; its underside is off-white. The dorsal and ventral fins on the upper side are dark, and the pectoral fin is long and mostly black. The caudal fin is rounded. The lateral line is nearly straight.

== Diet ==
The rex sole's diet consists of benthos invertebrates such as crustaceans, worms, shrimps and crabs.

== Commercial fishing ==
The rex sole is fished commercially for its flesh. Commercial fishing is conducted by trawler and the fish comprises a major part of the flatfish trawl fishery from California northward to the Bering Sea.
