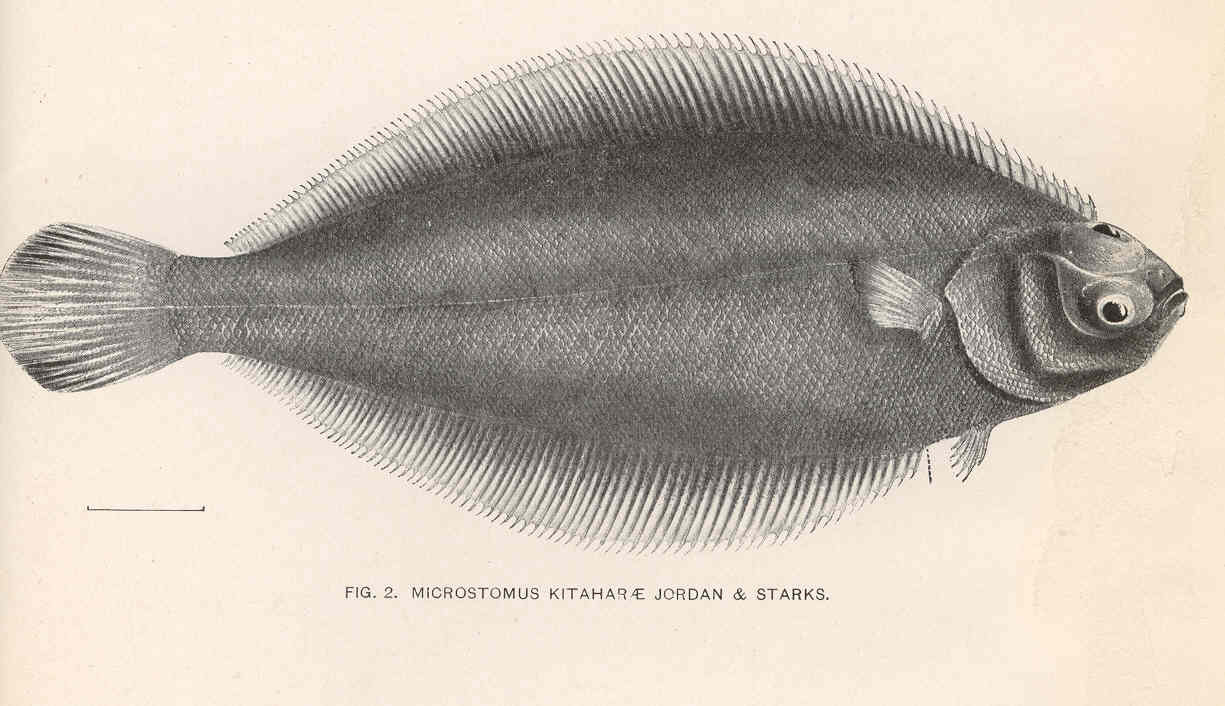

Conservation status
- Near Threatened (IUCN 3.1)

Scientific classification
- Kingdom: Animalia
- Phylum: Chordata
- Class: Actinopterygii
- Order: Carangiformes
- Suborder: Pleuronectoidei
- Family: Pleuronectidae
- Genus: Glyptocephalus
- Species: G. kitaharae

Binomial name
- Glyptocephalus kitaharae (Jordan & Starks, 1904)
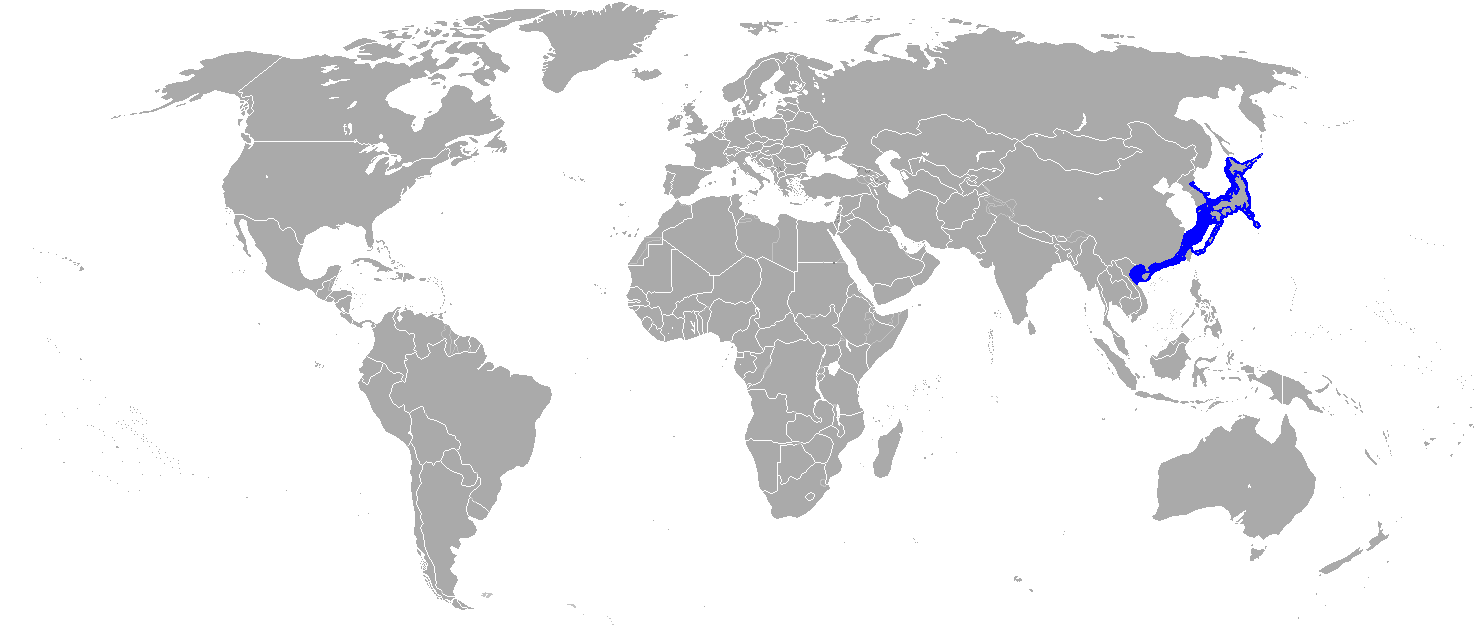
- Distribution of willowy flounder

Synonyms
- Microstomus kitaharae Jordan & Starks, 1904; Tanakius kitaharae (Jordan & Starks, 1904); Tanakius kitaharai (Jordan & Starks, 1904)

= Willowy flounder =

Species of fish

The willowy flounder (Glyptocephalus kitaharae) is a flatfish of the family Pleuronectidae. It is a demersal fish that lives on bottoms at depths of between 100 and 200 metres (330 and 660 ft). Its native habitat is the temperate waters of the Western Pacific, from Southern Hokkaido in Japan to the Gulf of Bohai, the East China Sea and Taiwan. It can grow up to 30 centimetres (12 in) in length. It is sometimes classified in the monotypic genus Tanakius.

== Diet ==
The diet of the willowy flounder consists mainly of zoobenthos organisms, including polychaetes, crabs and other benthos crustaceans.
