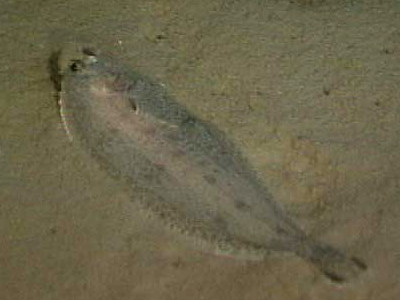
- Glyptocephalus cynoglossus

Scientific classification
- Kingdom: Animalia
- Phylum: Chordata
- Class: Actinopterygii
- Order: Carangiformes
- Suborder: Pleuronectoidei
- Family: Pleuronectidae
- Subfamily: Microstominae
- Genus: Glyptocephalus; Gottsche, 1835

Type species
- Pleuronectes saxicola Faber, 1828

Synonyms
- Tanakius Hubbs 1918

= Glyptocephalus =

Genus of fishes

Glyptocephalus is a genus of righteye flounders found in the northern Atlantic and northern Pacific Oceans

== Etymology ==
The word Glytocephalus is derived from the Greek γλύφειν (glyphein), meaning "to carve", and κεφαλή (kephalē), meaning "head".

== Species ==
There are currently four recognized species in this genus:

| Image | Scientific name | Common name | Distribution |
|---|---|---|---|
| | Glyptocephalus cynoglossus (Linnaeus, 1758) | witch, witch flounder, pole flounder, craig fluke, Torbay sole and grey sole | northern Atlantic Ocean |
| | Glyptocephalus kitaharae (Jordan & Starks, 1904) | Willowy flounder | northwest Pacific Ocean: Yellow Sea, Gulf of Bo Hai, East China Sea (Hokkaido, Taiwan, Japan) |
| | Glyptocephalus stelleri (P. J. Schmidt, 1904) | Blackfin flounder | northern Pacific, from the Sea of Japan to the Strait of Tartary and southern Kuril Islands and out into the Bering Sea. |
| | Glyptocephalus zachirus Lockington, 1879 | Rex sole | northern Pacific, from Baja California in Mexico up the coasts of the United States, British Columbia and Alaska, across the Bering Sea to the coast of Russia and the Sea of Japan. |
