= List of countries and territories bordering the Atlantic Ocean =

World map of countries bordering the Atlantic Ocean.

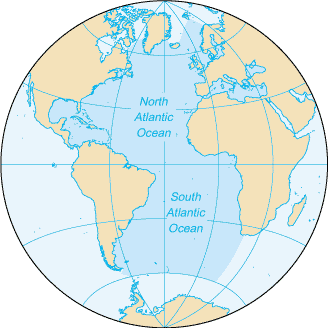
The Atlantic Ocean excluding its Arctic and Antarctic regions

List of states and dependent territories with a coastline on the Atlantic Ocean — including the North, Baltic, Mediterranean, and Black Seas — (dependent territories italicized with the sovereign state bracketed).

== Eurasia ==
- Azores (POR) ‡
- Faroe Islands (DEN)
- France
- Guernsey (UK)
- Iceland
- Ireland
- Isle of Man (UK)
- Jersey (UK)
- Norway
- Portugal
- Spain
- Svalbard and Jan Mayen (NOR)
- United Kingdom

=== North and Baltic Seas ===
- Åland (FIN)
- Belgium
- Denmark
- Germany
- Estonia
- Finland
- Kaliningrad Oblast (RUS)
- Latvia
- Lithuania
- Netherlands
- Poland
- Sweden

=== Mediterranean and Black Seas ===
- Albania
- Bosnia and Herzegovina
- Bulgaria
- Crimea (UKR)
- Croatia
- Cyprus †
- Georgia † (transcontinental country)
- Gibraltar (UK)
- Greece
- Israel †
- Lebanon †
- Italy
- Malta
- Monaco
- Montenegro
- North Cyprus (CYP) †
- Palestine †
- Romania
- Russia † (transcontinental country)
- Slovenia
- Syria †
- Turkey † (transcontinental country)
- Ukraine

† — Asiatic states and territories

== Africa ==
- Angola
- Benin
- Bouvet Island (NOR)
- Cameroon
- Canary Islands (ESP) ‡
- Cape Verde ‡
- Democratic Republic of the Congo
- Equatorial Guinea
- Gabon
- Gambia
- Ghana
- Guinea
- Guinea-Bissau
- Ivory Coast
- Liberia
- Madeira (POR) ‡
- Mauritania
- Morocco
- Namibia
- Nigeria
- Republic of the Congo
- Saint Helena, Ascension and Tristan da Cunha (UK)
- São Tomé and Príncipe
- Senegal
- Sierra Leone
- South Africa
- Togo
- Western Sahara

=== Mediterranean and Black Seas ===
- Algeria
- Ceuta (ESP)
- Egypt † (transcontinental country)
- Libya
- Melilla (ESP)
- Tunisia

‡ — Macaronesia

== The Americas ==
=== North America ===
- Bahamas
- Belize
- Bermuda (UK)
- Canada
- Costa Rica
- Greenland (DEN)
- Guatemala
- Honduras
- Mexico
- Nicaragua
- Panama (transcontinental country)
- Saint Pierre and Miquelon (FRA)
- United States

=== Caribbean ===
- Anguilla (UK)
- Antigua and Barbuda
- Aruba (NED)
- Barbados
- British Virgin Islands (UK)
- Caribbean Netherlands inc. Bonaire and Saba (NED)
- Cayman Islands (UK)
- Cuba
- Curaçao (NED)
- Dominica
- Dominican Republic
- Guadeloupe (FRA)
- Grenada
- Haiti
- Jamaica
- Martinique (FRA)
- Montserrat (UK)
- Navassa Island (USA)
- Puerto Rico (USA)
- Saint Barthélemy (FRA)
- Saint Kitts and Nevis
- Saint Lucia
- Sint Maarten (NED)
- Saint Martin (FRA)
- Saint Vincent and the Grenadines
- Sint Eustatius (NED)
- Trinidad and Tobago
- Turks and Caicos Islands (UK)
- United States Virgin Islands (USA)

=== South America ===
- Argentina
- Brazil
- Chile
- Colombia
- Falkland Islands (UK)
- French Guiana (FRA)
- Guyana
- South Georgia and the South Sandwich Islands (UK)
- Suriname
- Uruguay
- Venezuela

== See also ==
- Macaronesia
- Atlantic Ocean
- Atlantic World
- Atlantic History
