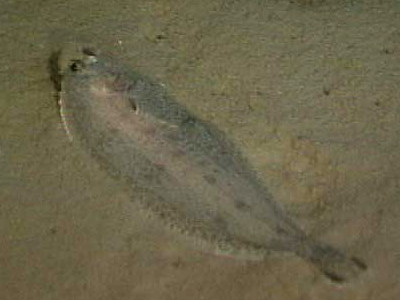

Conservation status
- Vulnerable (IUCN 3.1)

Scientific classification
- Kingdom: Animalia
- Phylum: Chordata
- Class: Actinopterygii
- Division: Teleostei
- Order: Carangiformes
- Suborder: Pleuronectoidei
- Family: Pleuronectidae
- Genus: Glyptocephalus
- Species: G. cynoglossus

Binomial name
- Glyptocephalus cynoglossus (Linnaeus, 1758)

Synonyms
- Pleuronectes cynoglossus Linnaeus, 1758; Pleuronectes saxicola Faber, 1828; Pleuronectes nigromanus Nilsson, 1829; Platessa elongata Yarrell, 1839; Glyptocephalus acadianus Gill, 1873–74

= Witch (righteye flounder) =

Species of fish

The witch (Glyptocephalus cynoglossus), known in English by a variety of other common names including the witch flounder, pole flounder, craig fluke, Torbay sole, and grey sole, is a species of flatfish from the family Pleuronectidae. It occurs on both sides of the North Atlantic Ocean on muddy sea beds in quite deep water. In northern Europe it has some importance in fisheries as a food fish.

== Description ==
The witch is a right-eyed flatfish with a small mouth which reaches the forward edge of the lower eye. The mouth contains a single series of small, incisor like teeth. It has a small head which takes up a fifth of the total length with large, open blister-like mucous pits on its blind side Its body is strongly, dorsally compressed and oval in shape. The body is elongated and has a standard length which is 2.5–3.5 times longer than it is broad. The lateral line is relatively straight and runs the length of its body with 110–140 scales. The dorsal fin has 95–120 rays and the anal fin has 85–102 rays, and there is a short, sharp spine pointing forward in front of the anal fin, which is created by an elongated first interhaemal spine of the post-abdominal bone, although this is sometimes so small that it is hidden. The pectoral fin on the eyed side is shorter than the head and the pectoral fins are blackish towards their tips. Almost all of the head and body, apart from the tip of the snout and the lower jaw is covered in smooth scales which make the fish slippery when held. They are brownish grey to greyish brown in colour on their eyed side, with less variation in colour than other flatfish, with the body and fins densely spotted with muted black spots; the median fins become duskier towards their margins. The blind side is white, marked with tiny black dots, although occasionally fish are recorded with the blind side a similar colour to the eyed side. They grow to a maximum size of 60 cm standard length but are normally no more than 40 cm.

== Distribution ==
The witch occurs on both sides of the North Atlantic Ocean. In the northeastern Atlantic Ocean it is found from the northernmost part of the Bay of Biscay to the Kattegat and into the westernmost part of the Baltic Sea, northwards along the entire coast of Norway and east in to the Murmansk region of Russia and west to the southern and western coasts of Iceland. In the western North Atlantic their range runs from Newfoundland and Labrador south as far as North Carolina, including the Grand Banks, Gulf of Maine, Gulf of St Lawrence and the Scotian Shelf.

== Habitat ==
Witch adults are found on the continental shelf and upper continental slope with a preference for fine sediments such as clay, muddy sand, and pure mud. They also occur where there are deep holes and channels on the continental shelf. These benthic organisms reside mainly in fairly deep water, ranging between 45 m (148 ft) and 1,460 m (4,790 ft), but mainly at depths between 184 m (604 ft) and 366 m (1,201 ft). This species prefers temperatures of 2–6 °C (36–43 °F). The juvenile fish cease to be nektonic when they grow to lengths of 5–6 cm (2.0–2.4 in) and adopt a benthic habit at shallower depths than the adults.

== Biology ==
The witch feeds on invertebrates and in European waters the main prey items are small crustaceans, starfish, small molluscs, and worms. Fish are rarely taken, if at all, and it does not take baits. Spawning occurs between May and September. and can take place in temperatures ranging from near freezing to 8.8-10 °C, experiments have demonstrated that the eggs continue to incubate normally in water which is as cold as 7.2 °C (45.0 °F). and as warm as 12.77 °C (54.99 °F). The eggs take around a week to hatch, the newly hatched larvae being about 4.9 mm (0.19 in) in length with a relatively large yolk sac. As the larvae grow they develop five transverse bands on their body, the reduced yolk and the fin folds. The entire yolk is absorbed when the larva is around 10 days old. At around 40 mm (1.6 in) the left eye has migrated to the dorsal surface of the head, the migration of the eye is completed at lengths of between 40 and 50 mm (1.6 and 2.0 in). and it is at this point that the young fish adopts a benthic habit. It is a slow growing species, sexual maturity is reached at 3–4 years and they have a lifespan of up to 14 years, although the maximum reported age is 25 years. Off Norway a sex ratio of 1:1 was found for fish up to the age of 9 years but in older fish this was skewed towards females. The fecundity of females varies with size with 48,800 eggs borne by a fish of 31 cm (12 in) in length to 508,300 eggs in one of 60 cm (24 in).

== Fisheries ==
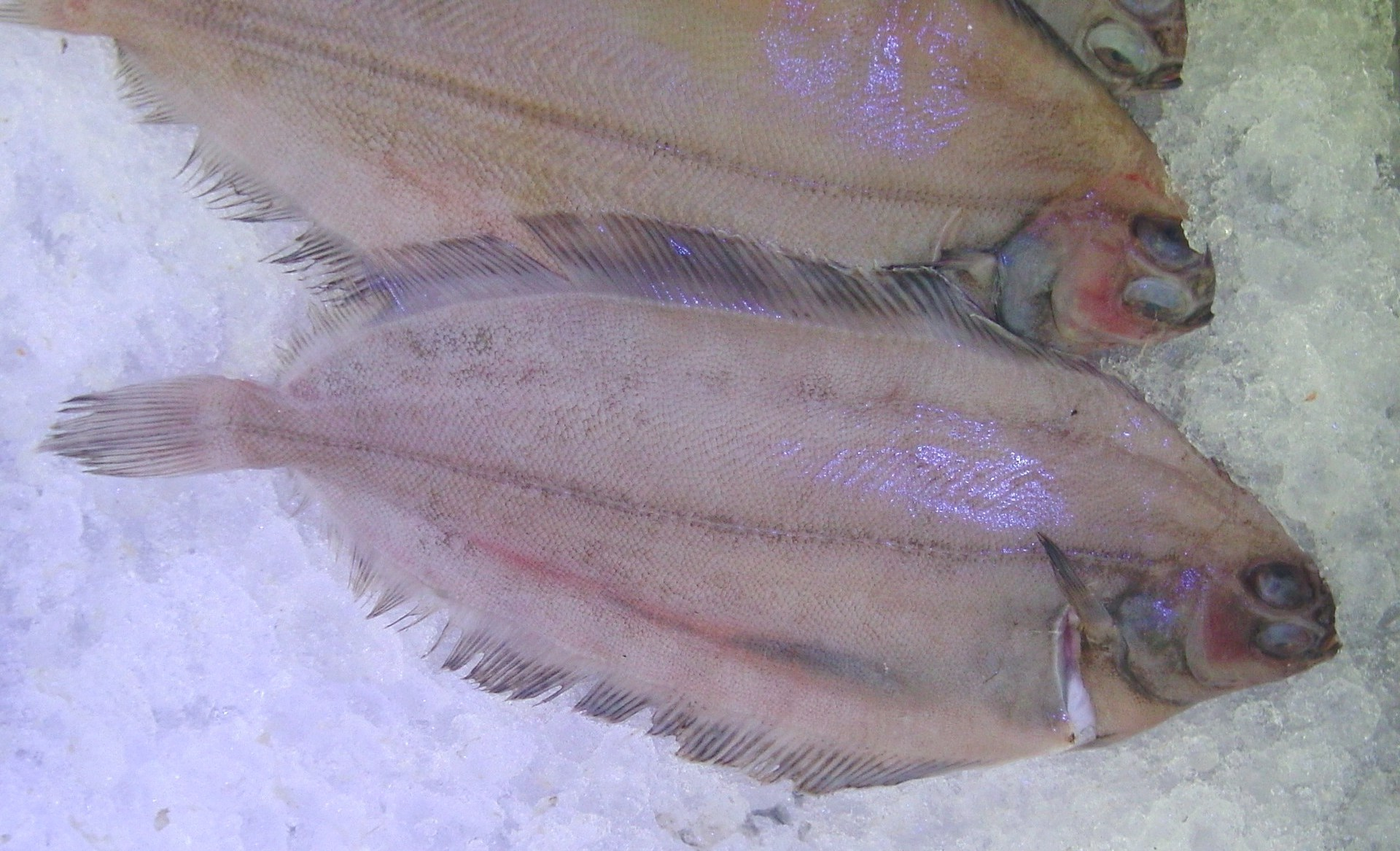
landed Glyptocephalus cynoglossus

The witch is commercially important as a bycatch and there are fisheries directed at this species, except that it is occasionally targeted in the Skagerrak. It is an important bycatch species in some fisheries which target the langoustine (Nephrops norvegicus). There was a notable increase in the landings of this species in the 1980s as a result of increased fishing effort by Iceland, Spain, and Norway. The North Sea is where most of the commercial landings in the northeast Atlantic are made and this species is rarely landed in Norway. The FAO reported a total catch for G. cynoglossus in 1999 of 18,969 tonnes, while more recent statistics are that approximately 13,600 tonnes are taken by European fisheries annually with United Kingdom vessels taking around 3,600 tonnes of this total catch. In North America commercial fisheries take around 2,700 tonnes annually. They are caught with bottom trawls using techniques known as "demersal bottom trawling" and "small flatfish (flounders, soles) bottom trawling". The IUCN classifies this species as Least Concern, but the damaging bottom trawling methods used to catch it may cause issues, and the large number discarded as bycatch by commercial vessels which are targeting other species is unknown. The flesh is marketed fresh or frozen and is eaten steamed, fried, microwaved and baked. The name Torbay sole appears to be a mainly culinary term, following the habit of renaming certain fish to broaden their appeal.

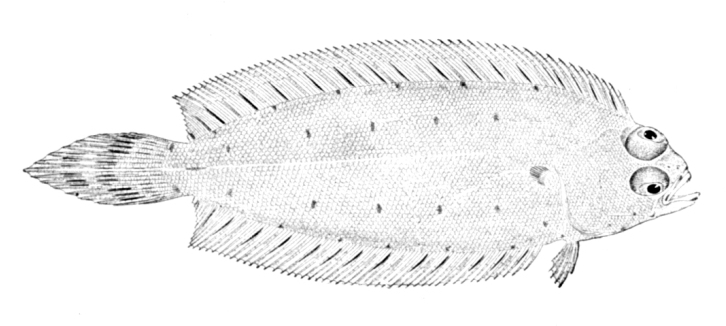
