= Cetacean surfacing behaviour =

Cetacean movement types

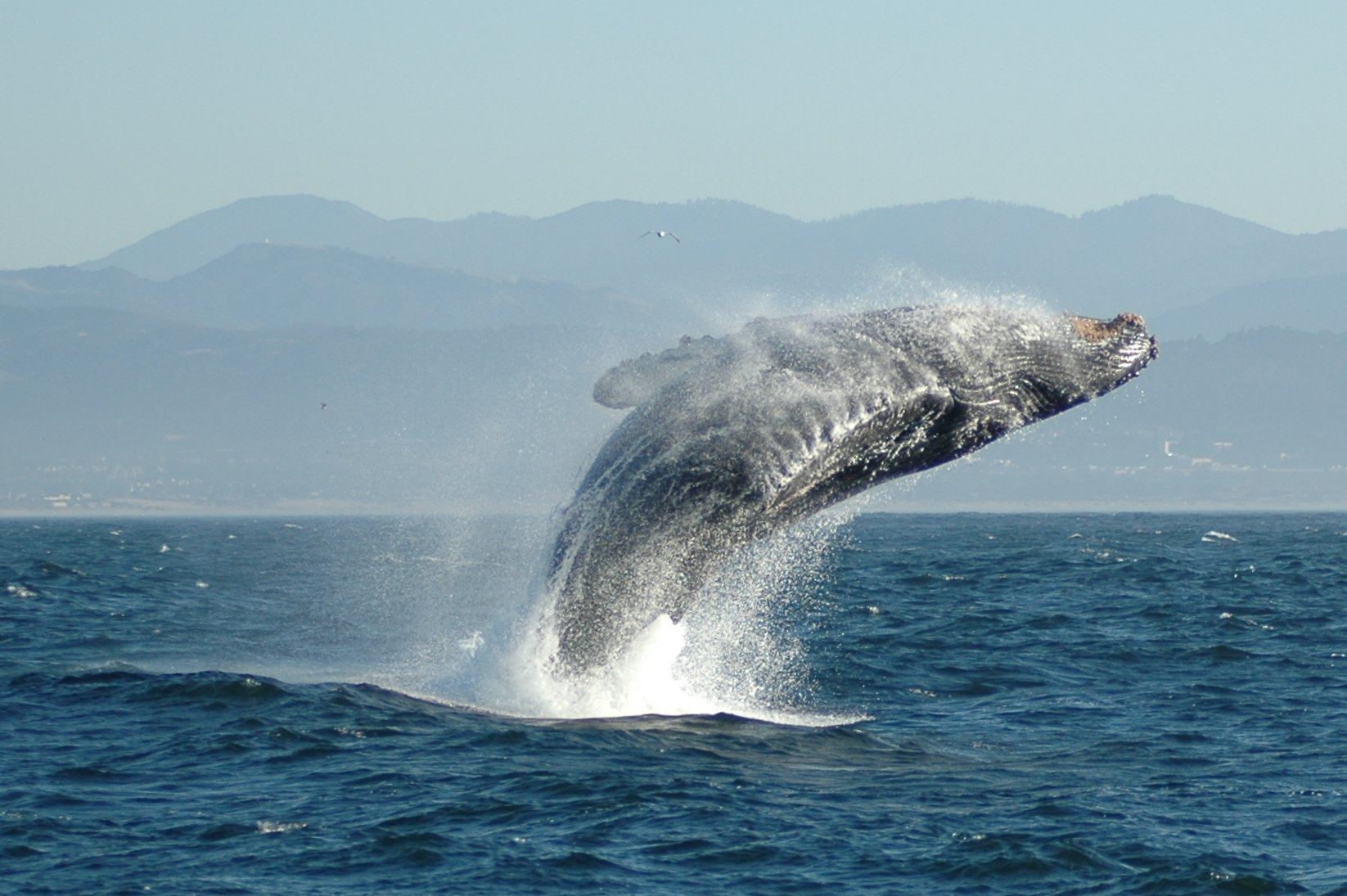
Humpback whale breaching

Cetacean surfacing behaviour is a grouping of movement types that cetaceans make at the water's surface in addition to breathing. Cetaceans have developed and use surface behaviours for many functions such as display, feeding and communication. All regularly observed members of the infraorder Cetacea, including whales, dolphins and porpoises, show a range of surfacing behaviours.

Cetacea is usually split into two suborders, Odontoceti and Mysticeti, based on the presence of teeth or baleen plates in adults respectively. However, when considering behaviour, Cetacea can be split into whales (cetaceans more than 10 m long such as sperm and most baleen whales) and dolphins and porpoises (all Odontocetes less than 10 m long including orca) as many behaviours are correlated with size.

Although some behaviours such as spyhopping, logging and lobtailing occur in both groups, others such as bow riding or peduncle throws are exclusive to one or the other. It is these energetic behaviours that humans observe most frequently, which has resulted in a large amount of scientific literature on the subject and a popular tourism industry.

== Travelling surface behaviour ==
=== Breaching and lunging ===
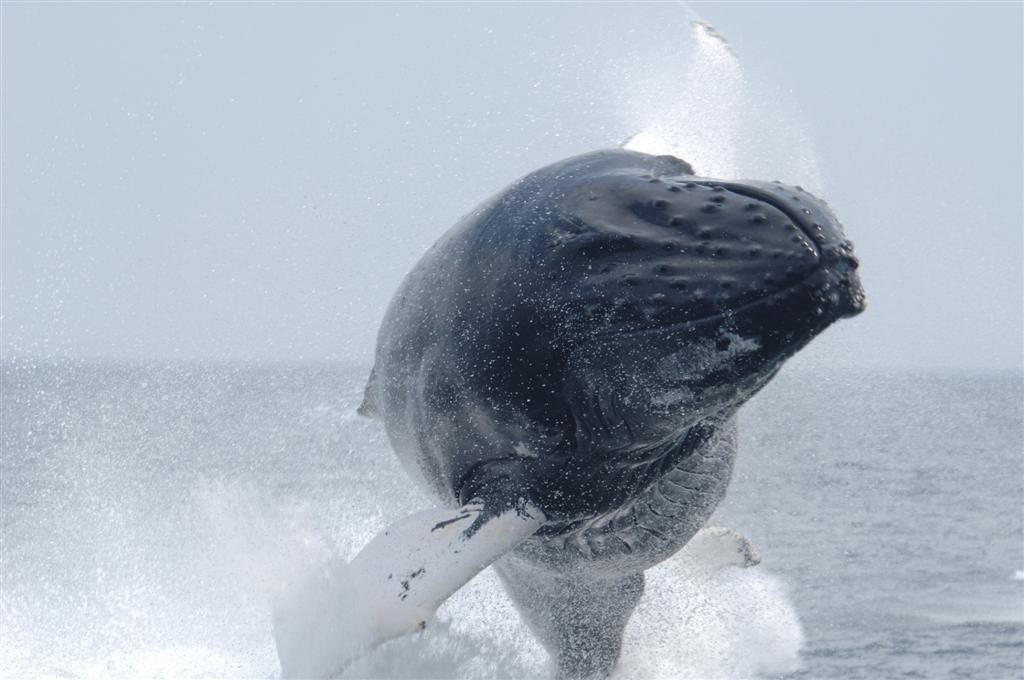
Humpback whale spinner-breaching

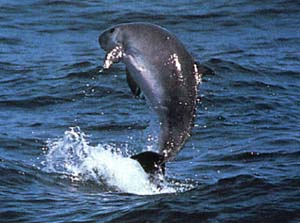
Dwarf sperm whale breaching

Orcas double-breaching off the south side of Unimak Island, Alaska

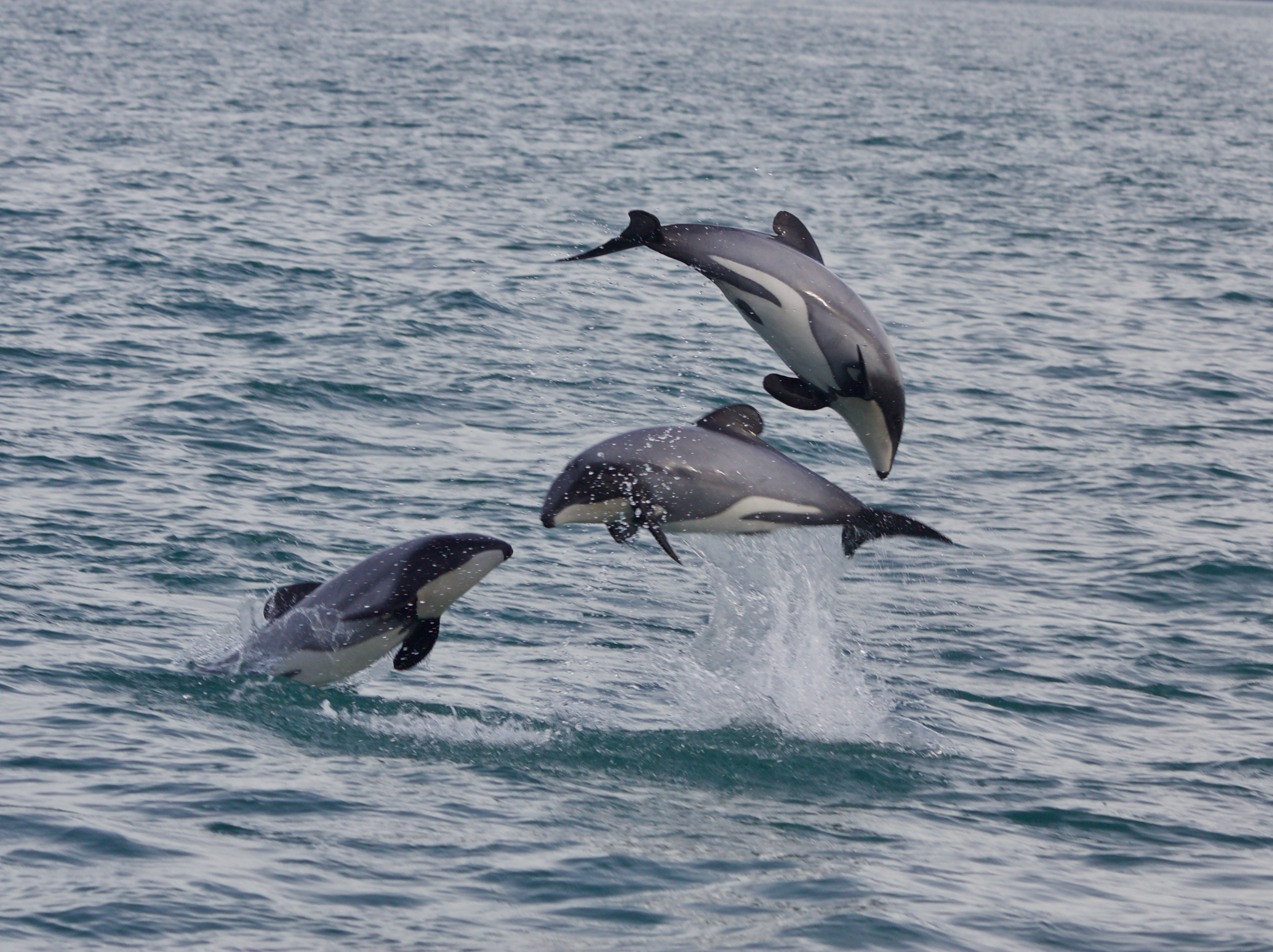
Hector's Dolphins off Cloudy Bay, New Zealand

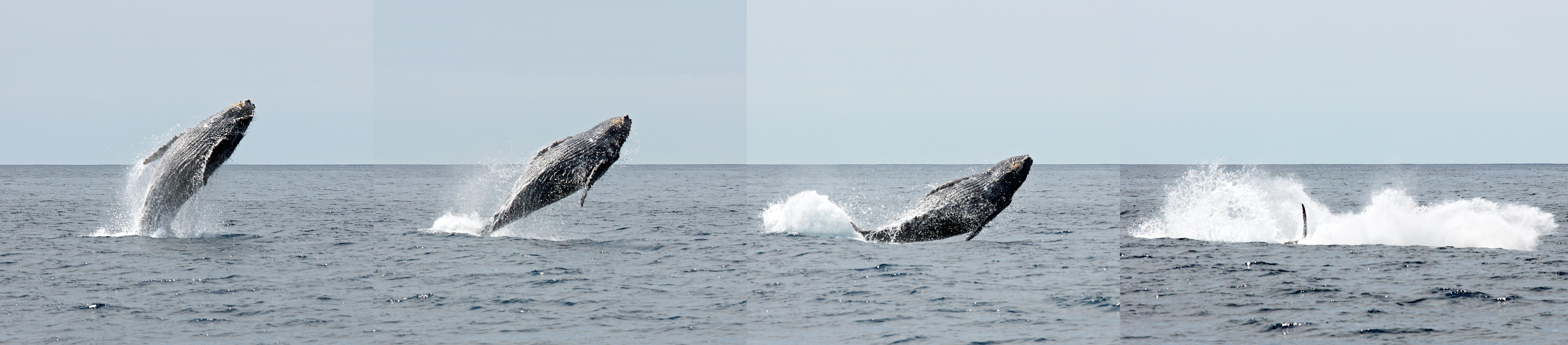
Humpback whale breach sequence

A breach or a lunge is a leap out of the water, also known as cresting. The distinction between the two is fairly arbitrary: cetacean researcher Hal Whitehead defines a breach as any leap in which at least 40% of the animal's body clears the water, and a lunge as a leap with less than 40% clearance. Qualitatively, a breach is a genuine jump with an intent to clear the water, whereas a lunge is the result of a fast upward-sloping swim that has caused the whale to clear the surface of the water unintentionally. This latter "lunging" behaviour is often a result of feeding in rorquals. The right, humpback, and sperm whales are the most widely observed jumpers. However other baleen whales such as fin, blue, minke, gray and sei whales also breach. Oceanic dolphins, including the orca, are very common breachers and are in fact capable of lifting themselves completely out of the water very easily, although there is little distinction between this and porpoising. Some non-cetacean marine creatures also exhibit breaching behavior, such as several shark species and rays of the genera Manta and Mobula.

Two techniques are used by cetaceans in order to breach. The first method, most common in sperm and humpback whales, is conducted by swimming vertically upwards from depth, and heading straight out of the water. The other more common method is to travel close to the surface and parallel to it, and then jerk upwards at full speed with as few as 3 tail strokes to perform a breach. In all breaches the cetacean clears the water with the majority of its body at an acute angle, such as an average of 30° to the horizontal as recorded in sperm whales. The whale then turns to land on its back or side, and less frequently may not turn but "belly flop" instead. In order to achieve 90% clearance, a humpback needs to leave the water at a speed of eight metres per second or 29 kilometres per hour (18 mph). For a 36 metric tons (40 short tons) animal, this results in a momentum of 288 thousand newton seconds. Despite its energetic cost, breaching is often carried out in series. The longest recorded sustained series was by a humpback near the West Indies totaling 130 leaps in less than 90 minutes. Repeated breaches tire the animal, so less of the body clears the water each time.

Ultimately, the reasons for breaching are unknown; however, there is evidence to support a range of hypotheses. Whales are more likely to breach when they are in groups, suggesting that it is a non-verbal signal to other group members during social behaviour. Scientists have called this theory "honest signalling". The immense cloud of bubbles and underwater disturbance following a breach cannot be faked; neighbours then know a breach has taken place. A single breach costs a whale only about 0.075% of its total daily energy intake, but a long series of breaches may add up to a significant energy expenditure. A breach is therefore a sign that the animal is physically fit enough to afford energy for this acrobatic display, hence it could be used for ascertaining dominance, courting or warning of danger. It is also possible that the loud "smack" upon re-entering is useful for stunning or scaring prey, similar to lobtailing. As breaching is often seen in rough seas it is possible that a breach allows the whale to breathe in air that is not close to the surface and full of spray, or that they use breaching to communicate when the noise of the ocean would mask acoustic signals. Another widely accepted possible reason is to dislodge parasites from the skin. The behaviour may also be more simply a form of play.

=== Porpoising ===
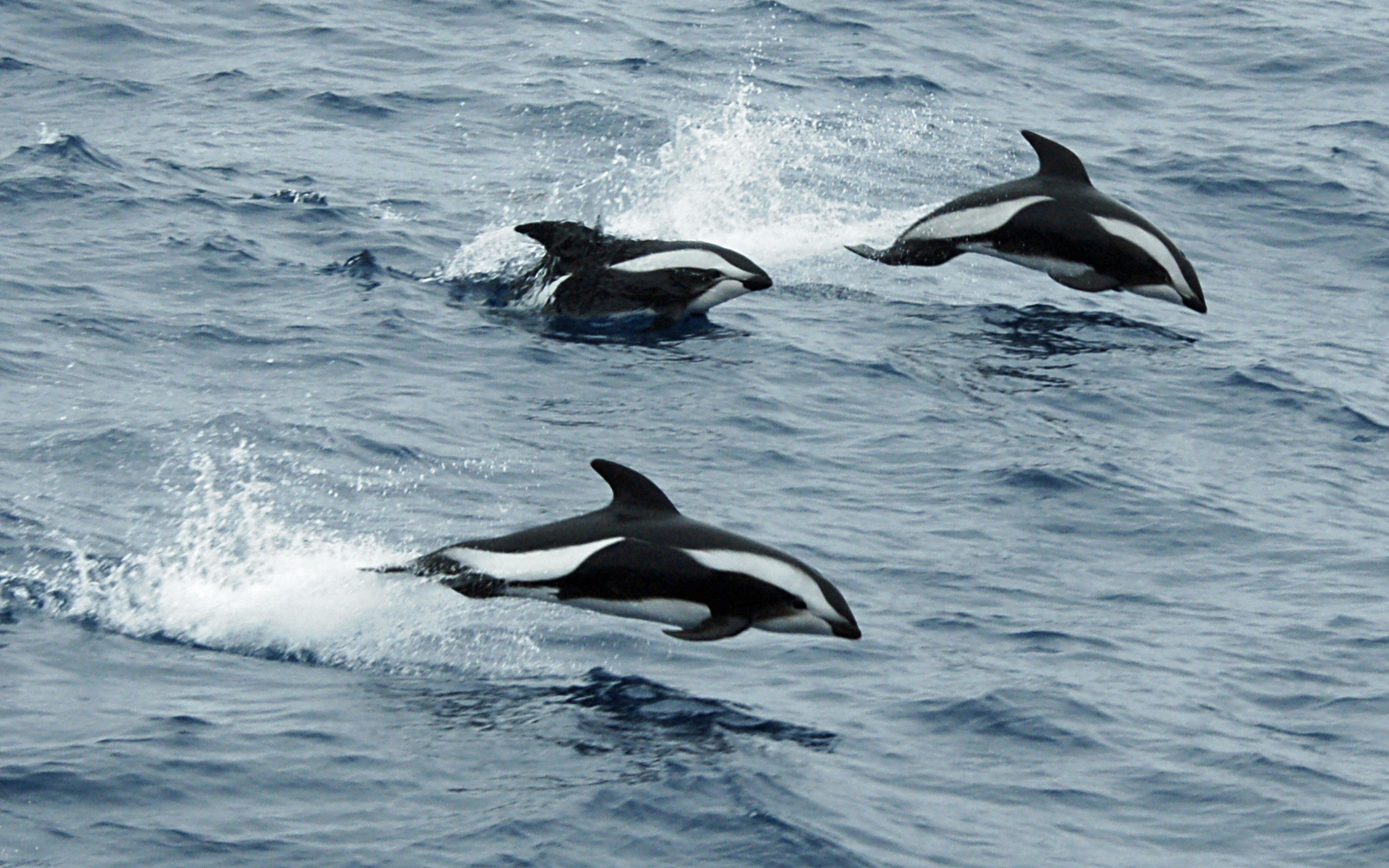
Hourglass dolphins in Drake Passage

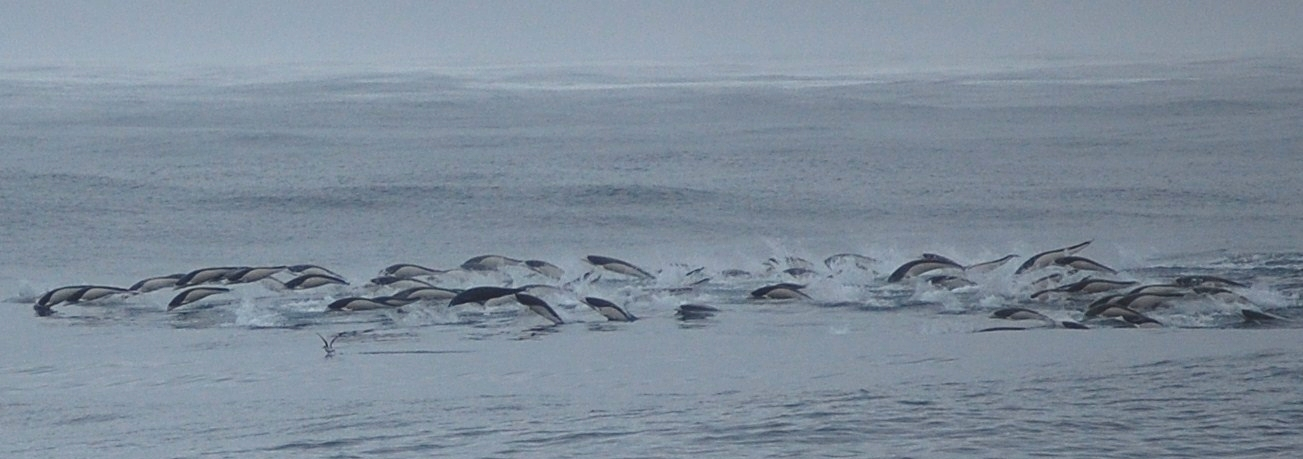
Southern right whale dolphins porpoising

Porpoising, also known as running, is a high speed surface behaviour of small cetaceans where long jumps are alternated with swimming close to the surface. Despite the name, porpoising behaviour is seen in dolphins and porpoises, as well as other marine species such as penguins and pinnipeds. When marine mammals are travelling at speed they are forced to stay close to the surface in order to maintain respiration for the energetic exercise. At leisurely cruising speeds below 4.6 m/s (15 ft/s), dolphins swim below the water's surface and only briefly expose their blowholes along with up to one third of their body at any one time. This results in little splashing as they have a very streamlined shape. Porpoising occurs mainly when dolphins and porpoises are swimming at speeds greater than 4.6 m/s. Here, jump length is roughly equal to distance traveled when the cetaceans are submerged. This exposes the blowhole for longer which is needed to get enough oxygen to maintain metabolism and therefore high speeds over long periods of time. Studies have also shown that leaping is more energetically efficient than swimming above a certain threshold speed. This is due to the reduction in friction when travelling in air compared to water which saves more energy than is needed to produce the leap. These benefits also outweigh the energy wasted due to the large amount of splashing often seen when groups are porpoising. Porpoising is therefore a result of high speed swimming which cetaceans use for important pursuit and escape activities. For example, dolphins may be seen porpoising away from their main predator, sharks or the direction of incoming boats to avoid collision.

Although porpoising is a useful product of rapid swimming, much variation seen in the behaviour cannot be explained by this cause alone; it has likely evolved to provide other functions. For example, the rotation during porpoising by the spinner dolphin leads to much splashing and is more common at slower speeds so cannot be attributed to an energy saving mechanism. It is therefore more likely to be a form of play or communication within or between pods. Another reason might be to remove barnacles or remoras that, when attached, increase drag during swimming. When spinner dolphins impact the water the combination of centrifugal and vertical force upon these ectoparasites can be up to 700 times their own weight and so efficiently remove them. Other theories suggest that cetaceans may porpoise in order to observe distant objects such as food by looking for visual cues, such as birds dive-bombing a bait ball. Research into the additional functions of porpoising has so far been focussed on the more acrobatic species, but it is likely that other cetaceans also use it for these, and perhaps unknown, reasons too.

=== Wave or bow-riding and following vessels ===
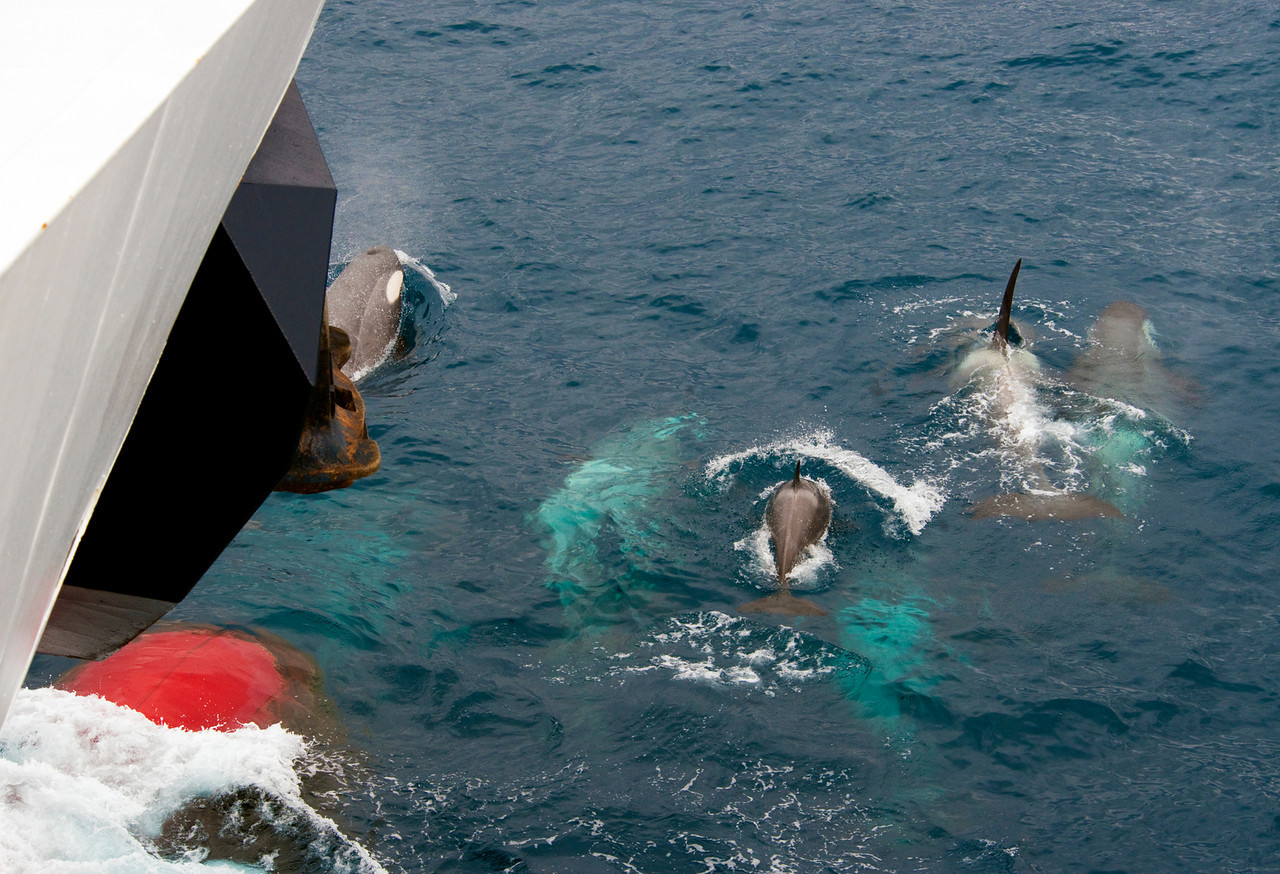
"Type B" orcas off South Georgia

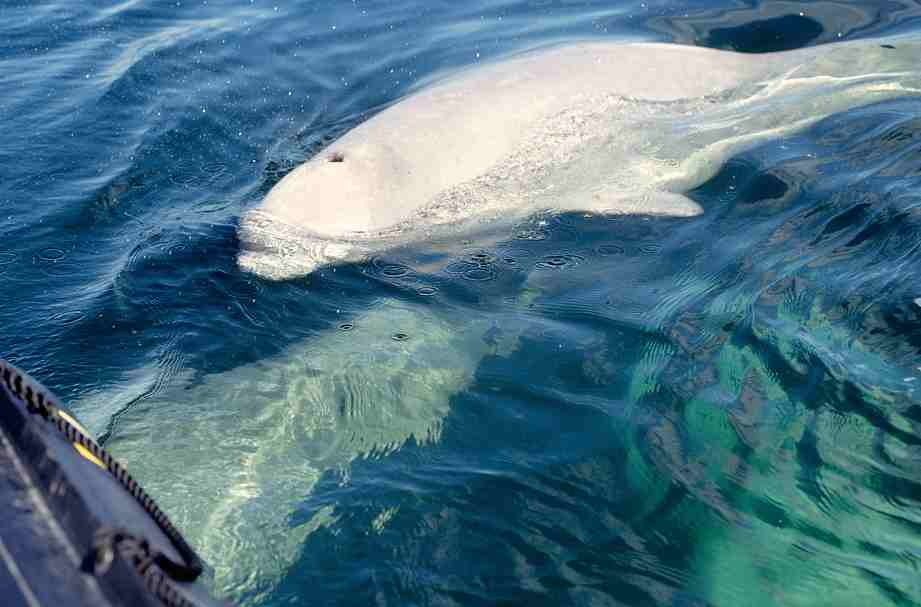
Belugas following watching boats in Churchill River

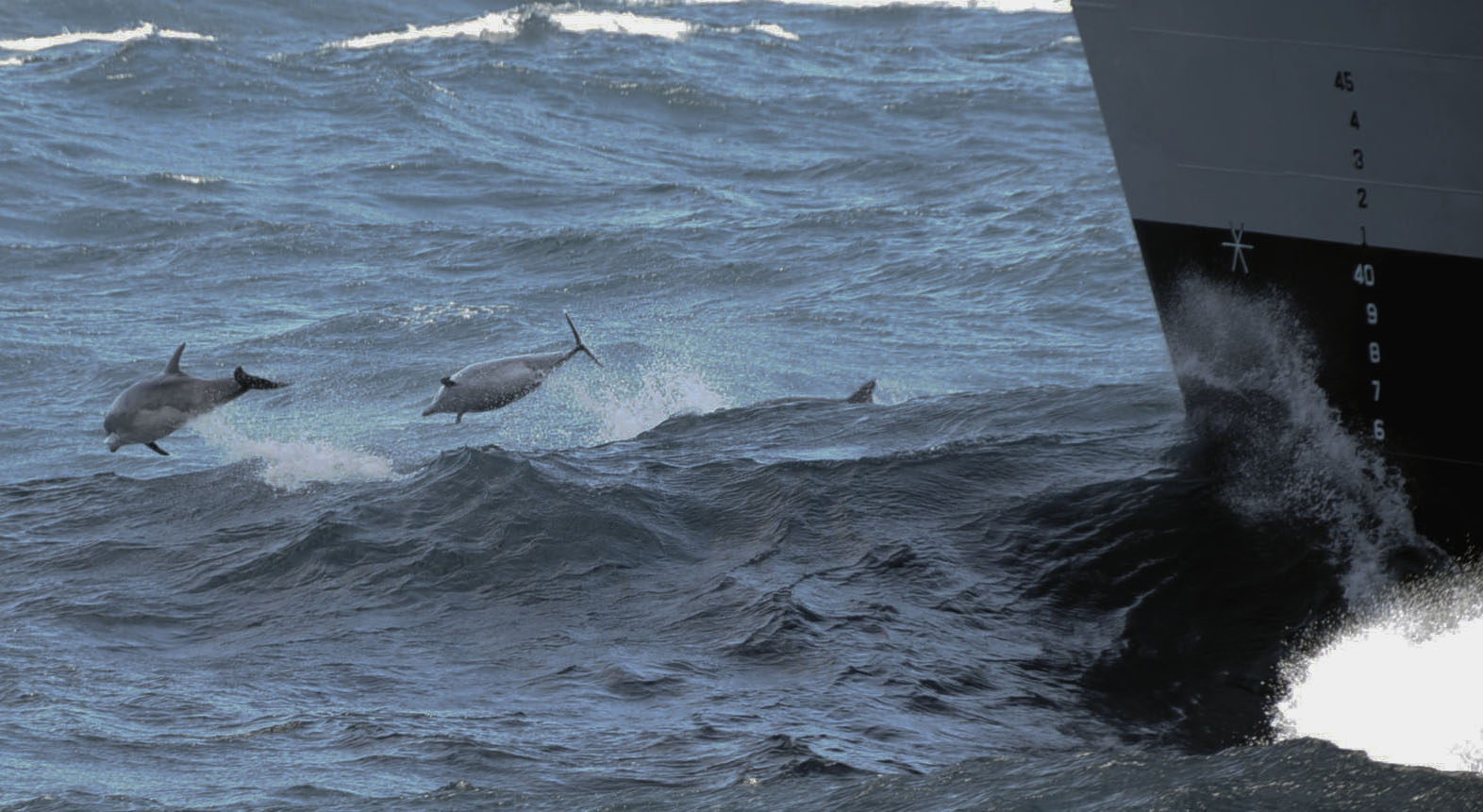

The term wave-riding is most commonly used to describe the surface activity of cetaceans that approach boats and jump repeatedly in the waves produced by the boats. This includes bow-riding, where cetaceans are in the pressure wave in front of the boat, and wake-riding, where they are off the stern in the wake. Cetaceans swim using fluke propulsion when experiencing wave energy below the threshold needed for riding, such as when boats travel at speeds slower than 3 m/s or when they are outside of the peak wave energy zone. However, at higher speeds dolphins and porpoises will seek out the pressure wave and its maximum energy zone in order to ride the wave by holding their flukes in a fixed plane, with only minor adjustments for repositioning. Wave-riding reduces the energetic cost of swimming to the dolphin, even when compared to slower swimming speeds. For example, heart rate, metabolic rate and transport cost was reduced by up to 70% during wave-riding compared to swimming at speeds 1 m/s slower in bottlenose dolphin. Wave-riding behaviour can be performed by dolphins from minutes up to several hours, and therefore is a useful energy-saving mechanism for swimming at higher speeds.

Wave-riding is most common in small Odontocetes. It has also been observed in larger cetaceans such as false killer whales and orca, although most larger Odontocetes do not seek out any form of interaction with boats. Bow-riding is the most common form of interactive behaviour with boats across a variety of smaller Odontocete species, such as dolphins in the genera Stenella and Delphinus. The type of interaction can often depend on the behavioral state of the group as well as species. For example, spotted dolphins are more likely to interact when travelling or milling but less likely when they are socialising or surface feeding. Interactive behavior may also depend on group composition, as both orca and bottlenose dolphins have been recorded to interact mostly when a calf was in the group. This indicates that groups with calves may approach boats in order to teach the young how to interact safely to avoid collision. Another result of cetaceans traveling in pods is an increase in competition for the optimal wave energy and so maximum energy saving position. Position of individuals may reflect the dominance hierarchy of the pod and therefore could be used to ascertain dominance. Several rorquals, such as minke, sei, bryde's, humpback, and gray are also known to display actions in similar manners.

==== Gallery ====
- Media related to Jumping dolphins at Wikimedia Commons

== Stationary surface behaviour ==
=== Spyhopping ===
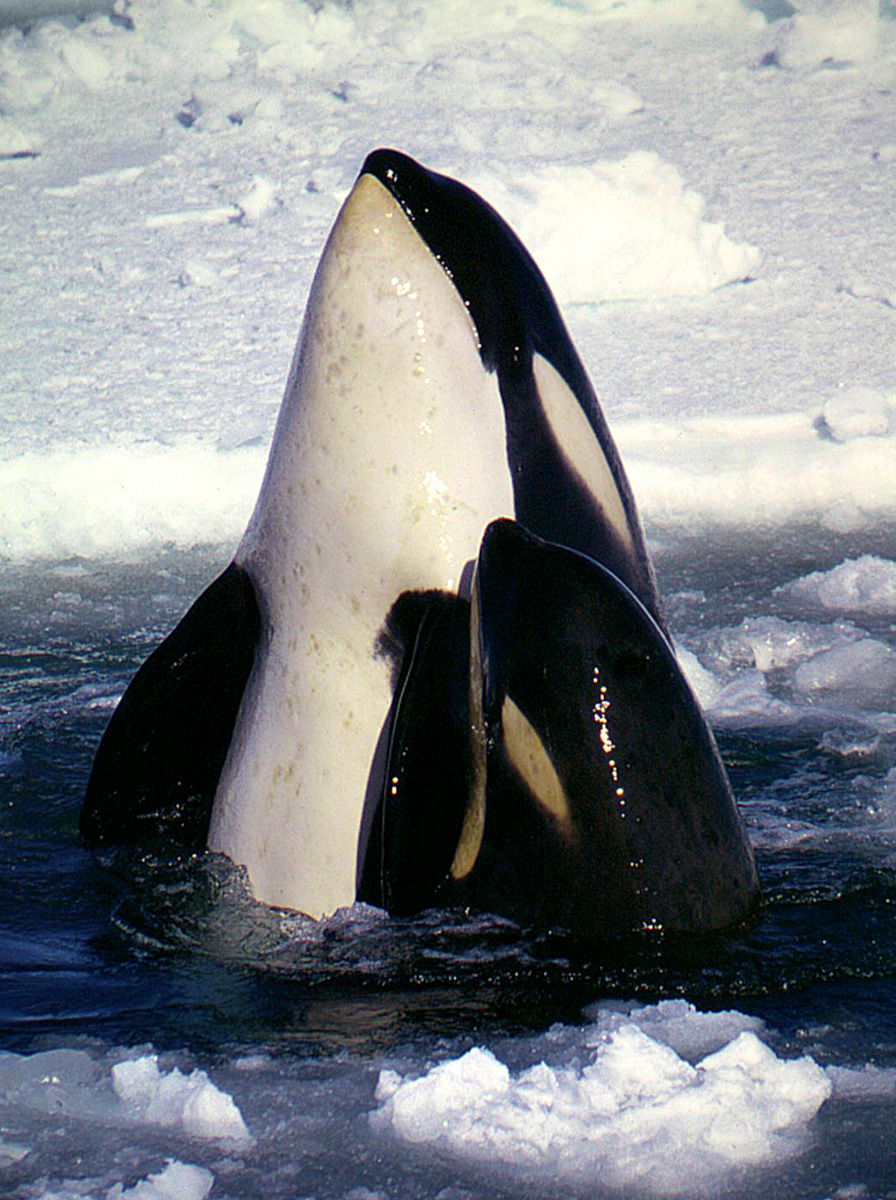
Orca ("type C") spyhopping

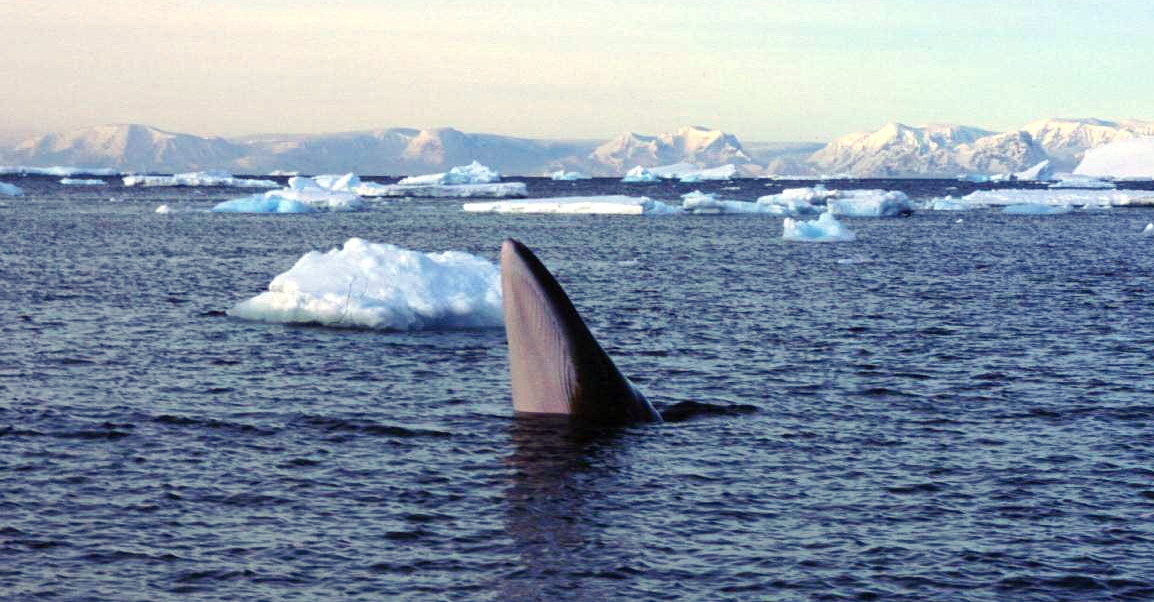
Southern minke whale spyhopping in Antarctica

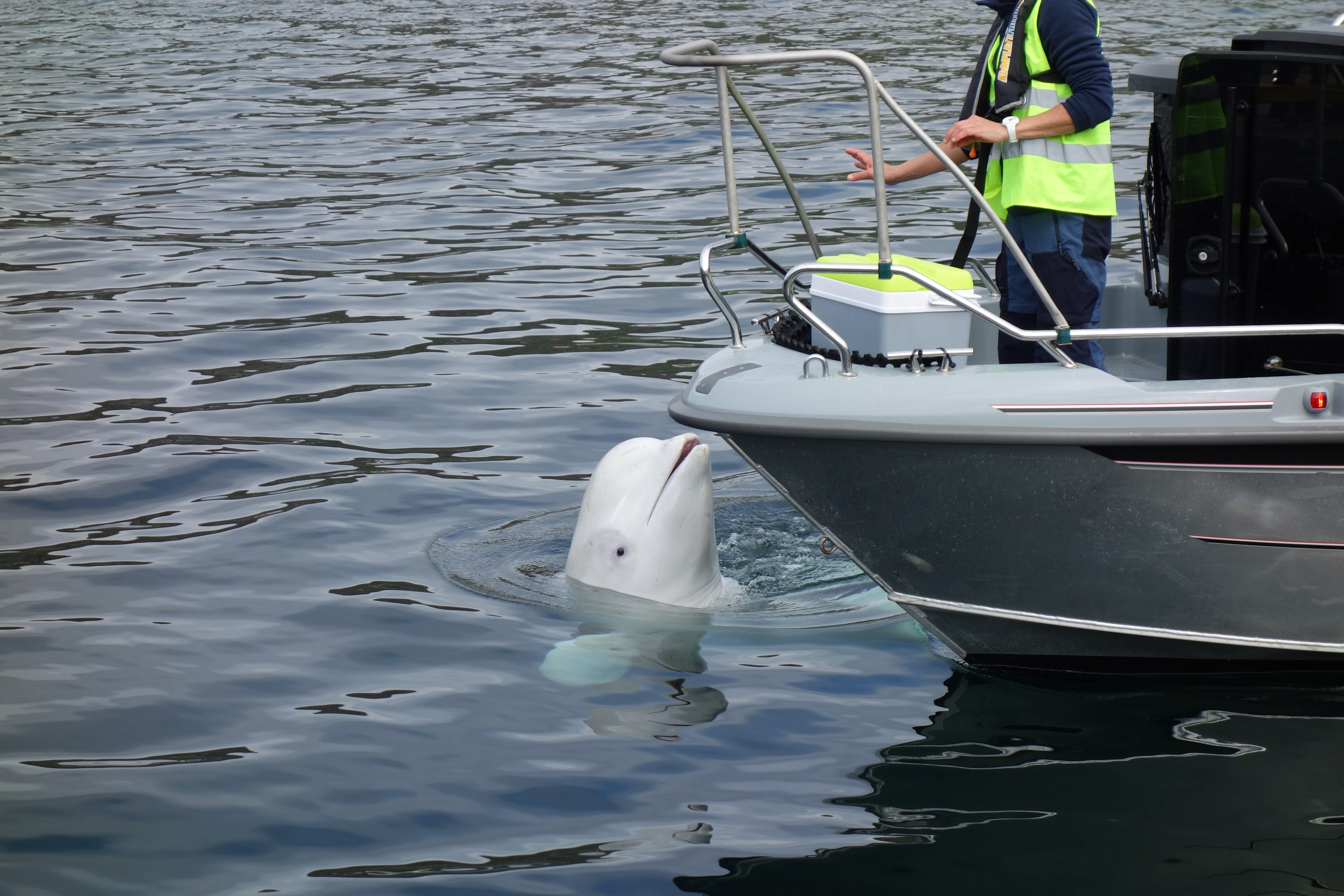
Hvaldimir, a beluga whale, spyhopping to investigate a boat in Hammerfest harbour, Norway

When spyhopping, the whale rises and holds a vertical position partially out of the water, often exposing its entire rostrum and head. It is visually akin to a human treading water. Spyhopping is controlled and slow, and can last for minutes at a time if the whale is sufficiently inquisitive about whatever it is viewing. Generally, the whale does not appear to swim by fluke propulsion to maintain its "elevated" position while spyhopping, instead relying on exceptional buoyancy control and positioning with pectoral fins. Typically the whale's eyes will be slightly above or below the surface of the water, enabling it to see whatever is nearby on the surface. Different species of sharks, including the great white shark and oceanic whitetip shark, have also been known to spyhop.

Spyhopping often occurs during a "mugging" situation, where the focus of a whale's attention is on a boat, such as whale-watching tours, which they sometimes approach and interact with. On the other hand, spyhopping among orcas is thought to aid predation, as they are often seen around ice floes attempting to view prey species such as seals that are resting on the floes. When prey is detected the individual will conduct a series of spy-hops from different locations around it, then vocalise to the group members to do the same to possibly prepare for an attack. In this instance a spyhop may be more useful than a breach, because the view is held steady for a longer period of time. Often when cetaceans breach, their eyes do not clear the water, which suggests it might not be used for looking but instead for hearing. For example, gray whales will often spy-hop in order to hear better when they are near the line where waves begin to break in the ocean as this marks out their migration route.

=== Lobtailing and slapping ===
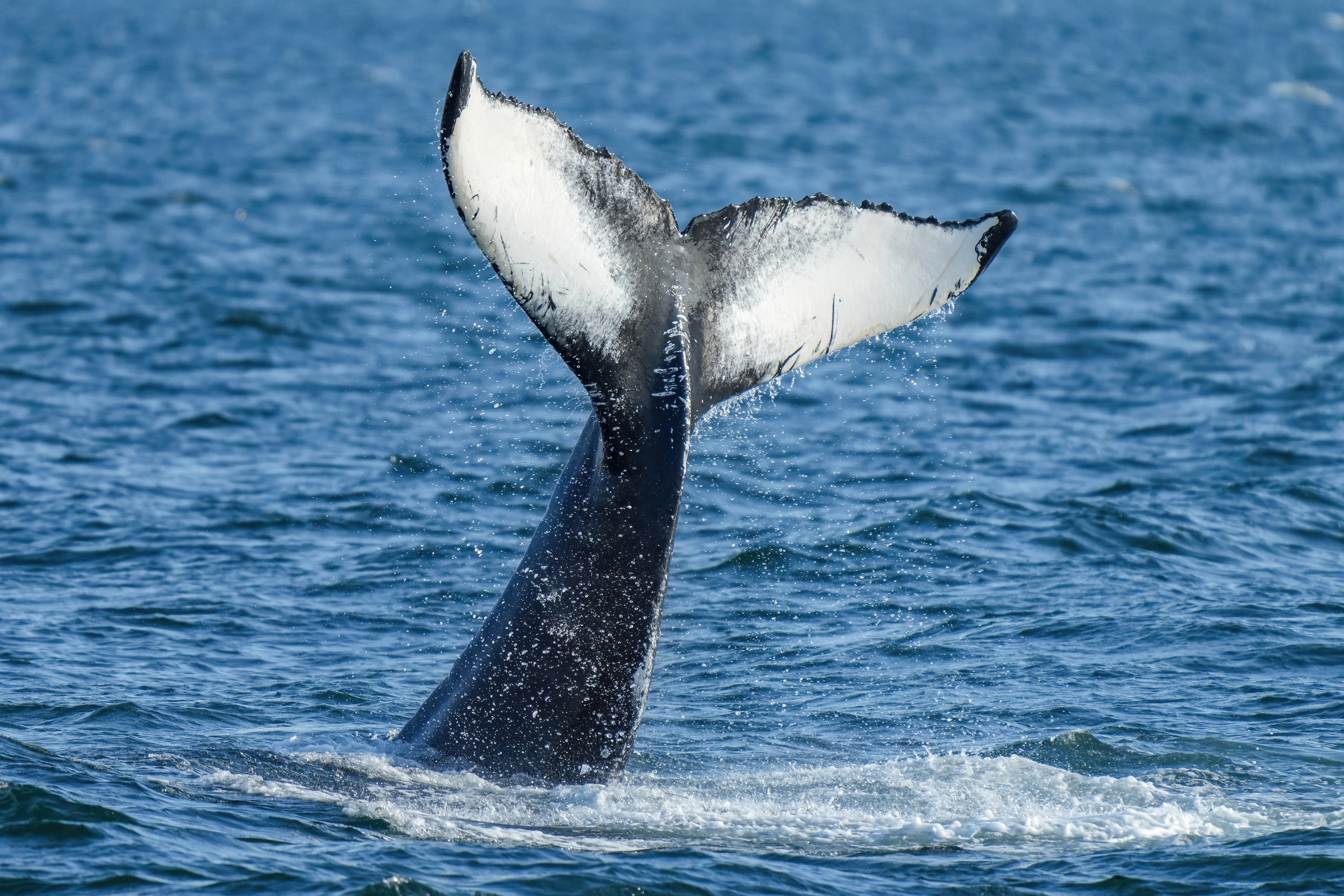
Humpback whale lobtailing at Ísafjarðardjúp, Iceland

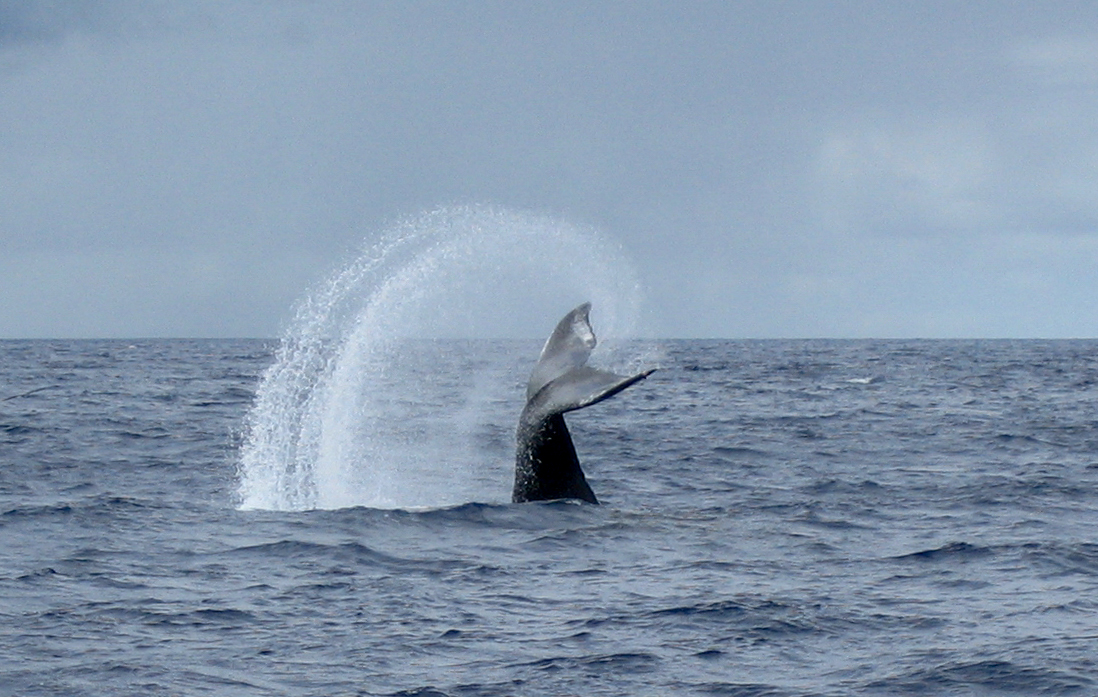
Humpback whale tail-slapping off the coast of Molokai, Hawaii

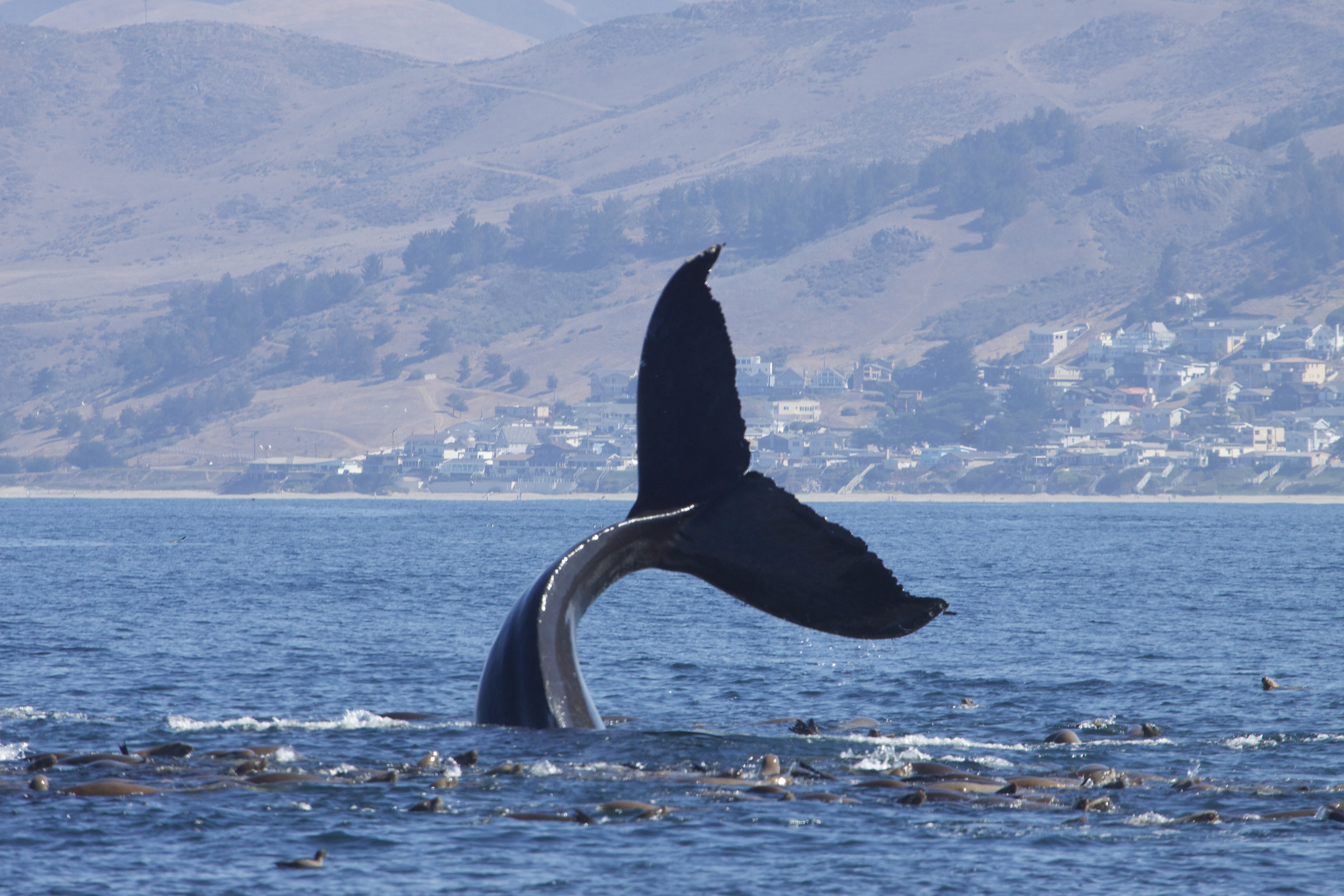
Humpback whale tail-slapping with California sea lions

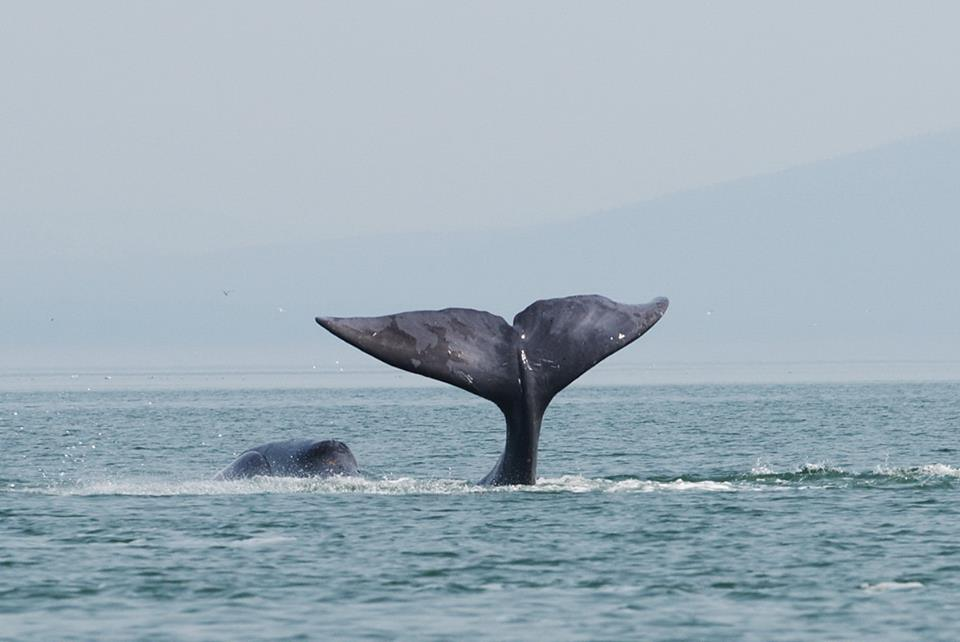
Bowhead whale tail-slapping in Shantar Islands

Lobtailing is the act of a whale or dolphin lifting its flukes out of the water and then bringing them down onto the surface of the water hard and fast in order to make a loud slap. Large whales tend to lobtail by positioning themselves vertically downwards into the water and then slapping the surface by bending the tail stock. Dolphins, however, tend to remain horizontal, either on their belly or their back, and make the slap via a jerky whole body movement. All species are likely to slap several times in a single session. Like breaching, lobtailing is common amongst active cetacean species such as sperm, humpback, right and gray whales. It is less common, but still occasionally occurs, amongst the other large whales. Porpoises and river dolphins rarely lobtail, but it is a very common phenomenon amongst oceanic dolphins. Lobtailing is more common within species that have a complex social order than those where animals are more likely to be solitary. Lobtailing often occurs in conjunction with other aerial behaviour such as breaching. Species with large flippers may also slap them against the water for a similar effect, known as pectoral slapping.

The sound of a lobtail can be heard underwater several hundred metres from the site of a slap. This has led to speculation amongst scientists that lobtailing is, like breaching, a form of non-vocal communication. However, studies of bowhead whales have shown that the noise of a lobtail travels much less well than that of a vocal call or a breach. Thus the lobtail is probably important visually as well as acoustically, and may be a sign of aggression. Some suggest that lobtailing in humpback whales is a means of foraging. The hypothesis is that the loud noise causes fish to become frightened, thus tightening their school together, making it easier for the humpback to feed on them. In this instance, lobtail feeding behaviour appeared to progressively spread throughout the population, as it increased from 0 to 50% of the population using it over the nine-year study. As no individual under two years old nor any mothers were observed to use lobtail feeding it suggests that it is taught in foraging groups. The spread of lobtail feeding amongst humpback whales indicates its success as a novel foraging method.

==== Gallery ====
- Media related to Whales with raised tail at Wikimedia Commons

=== Peduncle throw ===
A peduncle throw, also known as peduncling, is a surfacing behaviour unique to humpback whales. During this the humpback converts its forward momentum into a crack-the-whip rotation, pivoting with its pectorals as it drives its head downward and thrusts its entire fluke and peduncle (the muscular rear portion of the torso) out of the water and sideways, before crashing into the water with terrific force. Peduncling takes place among the focal animals (female, escort, challenging male) in a competitive group, apparently as an aggressive gesture. Possibilities include escorts fending off a particular challenging male, females who seem agitated with an escort, or an individual not comfortable with a watching boat's presence. Occasionally, one whale performs a series of dozens of peduncle throws, directed at the same target each time.

=== Pectoral slapping ===
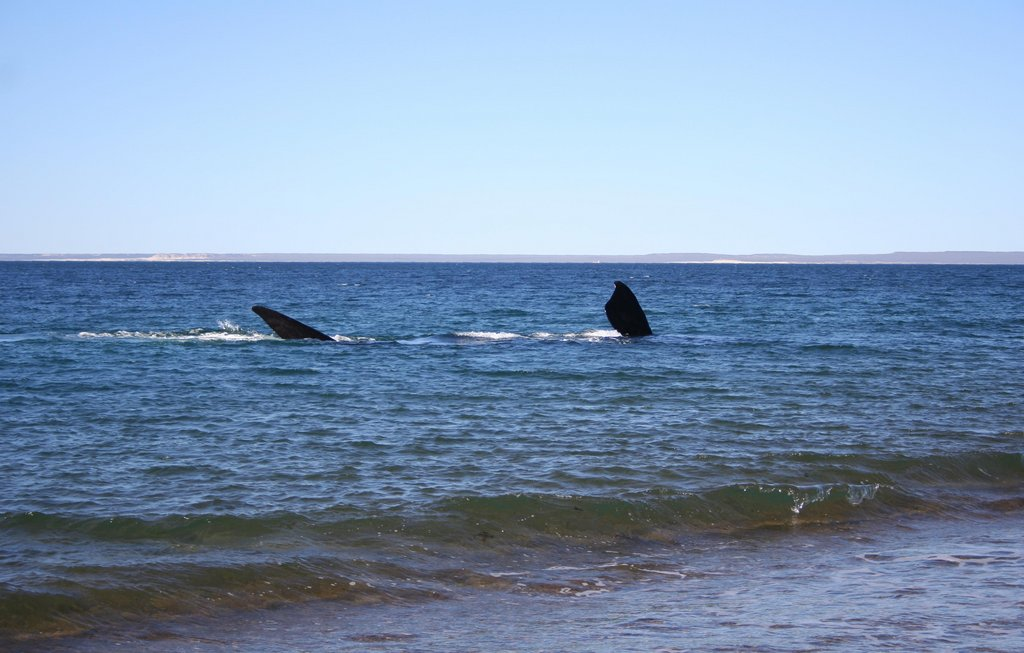
Southern right whale showing pectoral fins

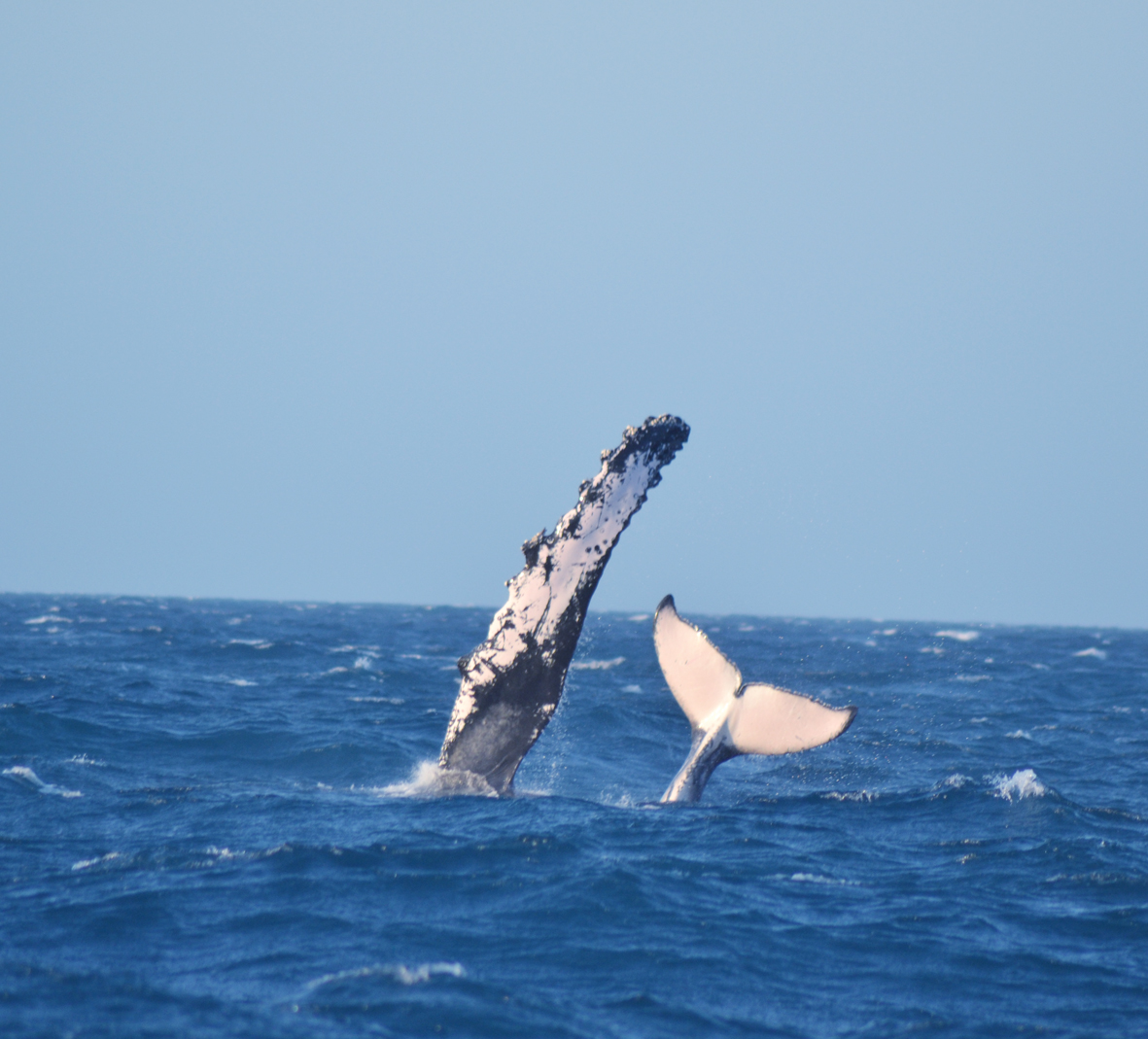
Humpback whales

Pectoral slapping, informally known as pec-slapping, is when a cetacean turns on its side, exposes one or both pectoral fins into the air, and then slaps them against the surface of the water. It is a form of non-vocal communication commonly observed in a variety of whale and dolphin species as well as seals. The motion is slow and controlled, and the behaviour can occur repeatedly by one individual over a few minutes. The humpback whale's pectoral fin is the largest appendage of any mammal and humpbacks are known for their extremely acrobatic behaviour. Pec-slapping varies between groups of different social structure, such as not occurring in lone males but being common in mother calf pairs and also when they are accompanied by an escort. The reasons for pec-slapping therefore can vary depending on age and sex of individual humpback whales. During the breeding season adult males pec-slap before they disassociate with a group of males that are vying for a female, whereas adult females pec-slap to attract potential mates and indicate that she is sexually receptive. Its function between mother calf pairs is less well known but is likely to be a form of play and communication that is taught to the calf by the mother for use when it is sexually mature. Pectoral slapping has also been observed in the right whale, but due to its smaller size, the sound produced will be quieter and therefore used for communication over smaller distances unlike the humpback. Exposure of the pectoral fin and consequent slapping has also been infrequently observed in blue whales, where it is most often a by-product of lunge feeding followed by rolling on to its side.

=== Logging ===
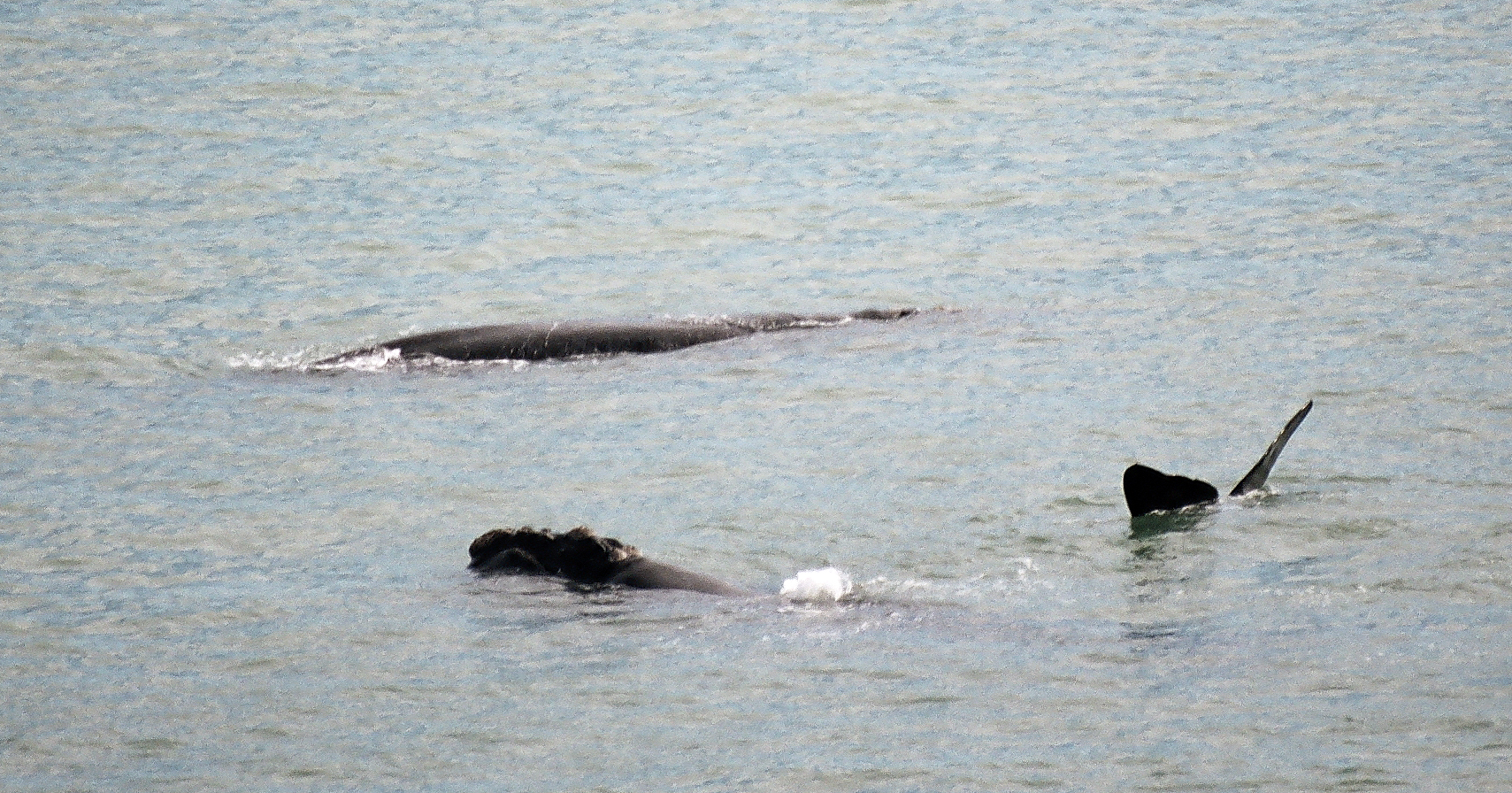
Southern right whales resting

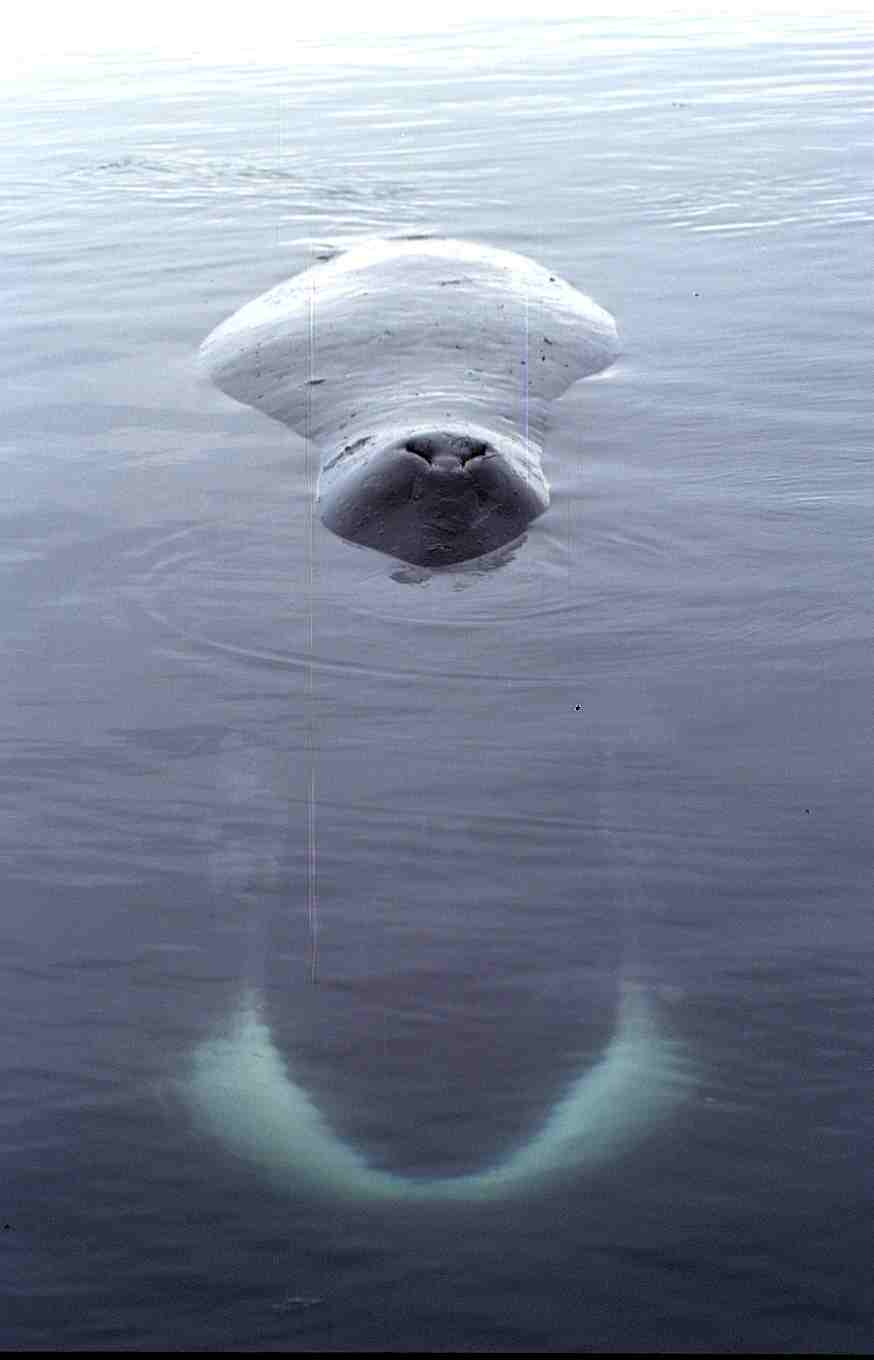
Bowhead whale sleeping

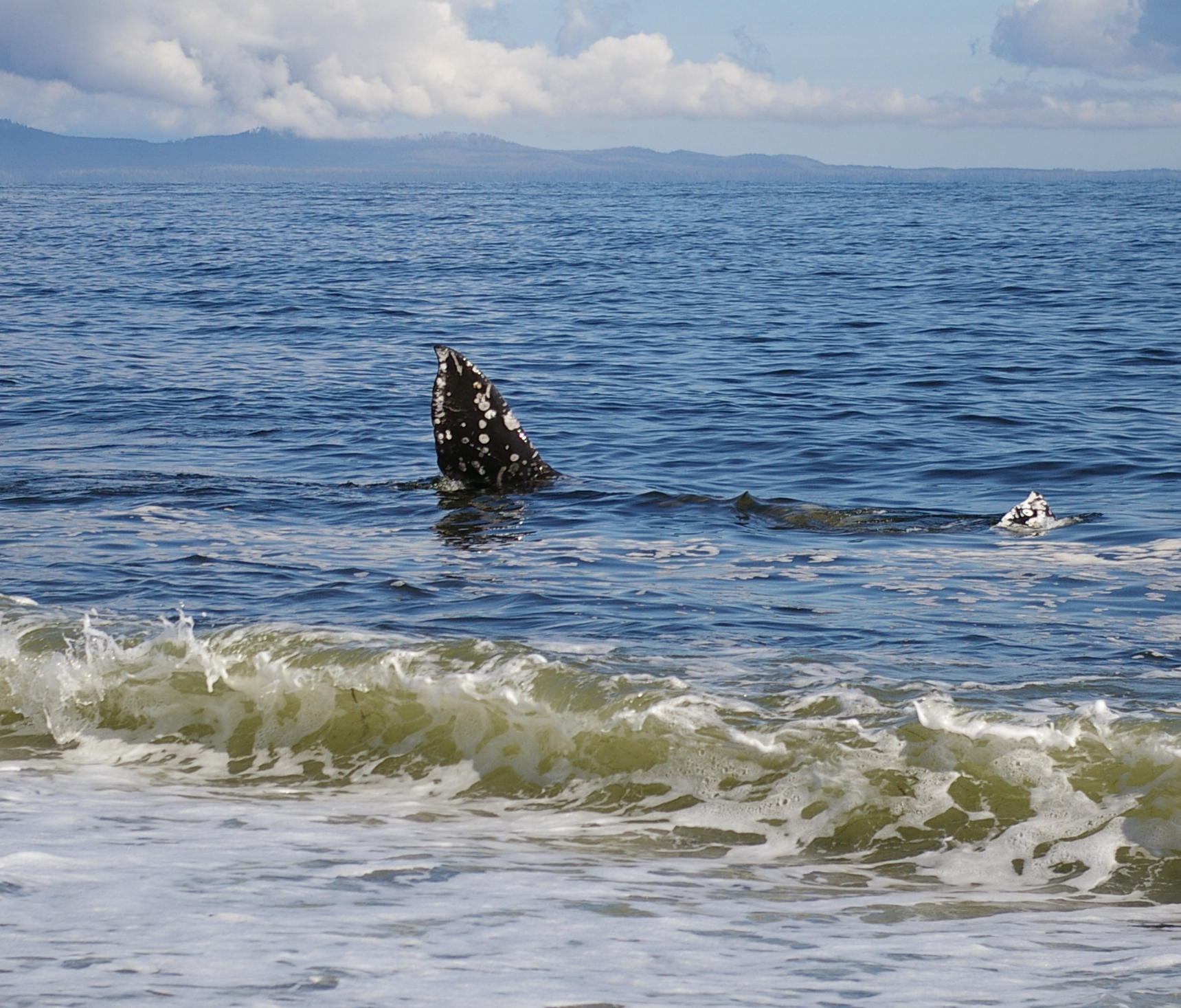
Gray whale cavorting

Logging is a behaviour that whales exhibit when at rest and appear like "logs" at the surface. It is defined as lying without forward movement at the surface of the water with the dorsal fin or parts of the back are exposed. Whales often rest for periods of time under the surface in order to sleep in mainly horizontal positions, although sperm whales also rest vertically. However, as they consciously need to breathe at the surface, they can rest only one-half of their brain at a time, known as unihemispheric slow-wave sleep. This sleep pattern has been identified in all five cetacean species that have been tested for it thus far. Cetaceans intermittently come to the surface in order to breathe during these sleep periods and exhibit logging behaviour. Logging can occur interchangeably with surface resting behaviour when cetaceans are travelling slowly, which is particularly common in mother-calf pairs, as the young tire quickly during swimming. Logging is common, particularly in right whales, sperm whales, pilot whales and humpback whales. Another behaviour that may be mistaken for logging is milling, where a group of cetaceans at the surface have little or no directional movement but instead socialise with each other. This behaviour is particularly common in large groups of pilot whales.

== Dive times ==
Time intervals between surfacing can vary depending on the species, surfacing style or the purpose of the dive; some species have been known to dive for up to 85 minutes at a time when hunting, and dives in excess of three hours have been observed in Cuvier's beaked whale under extreme circumstances.

== Human interaction ==
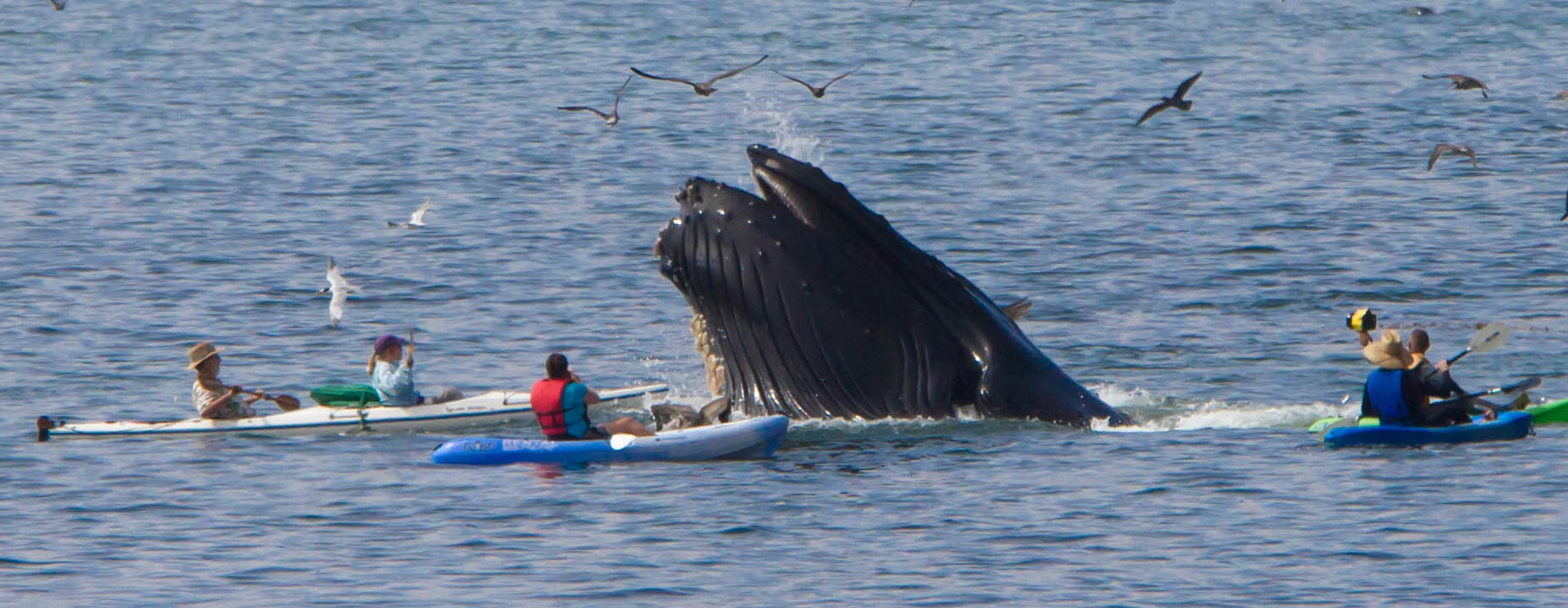
Humpback whale and kayakers off Avila Beach, California

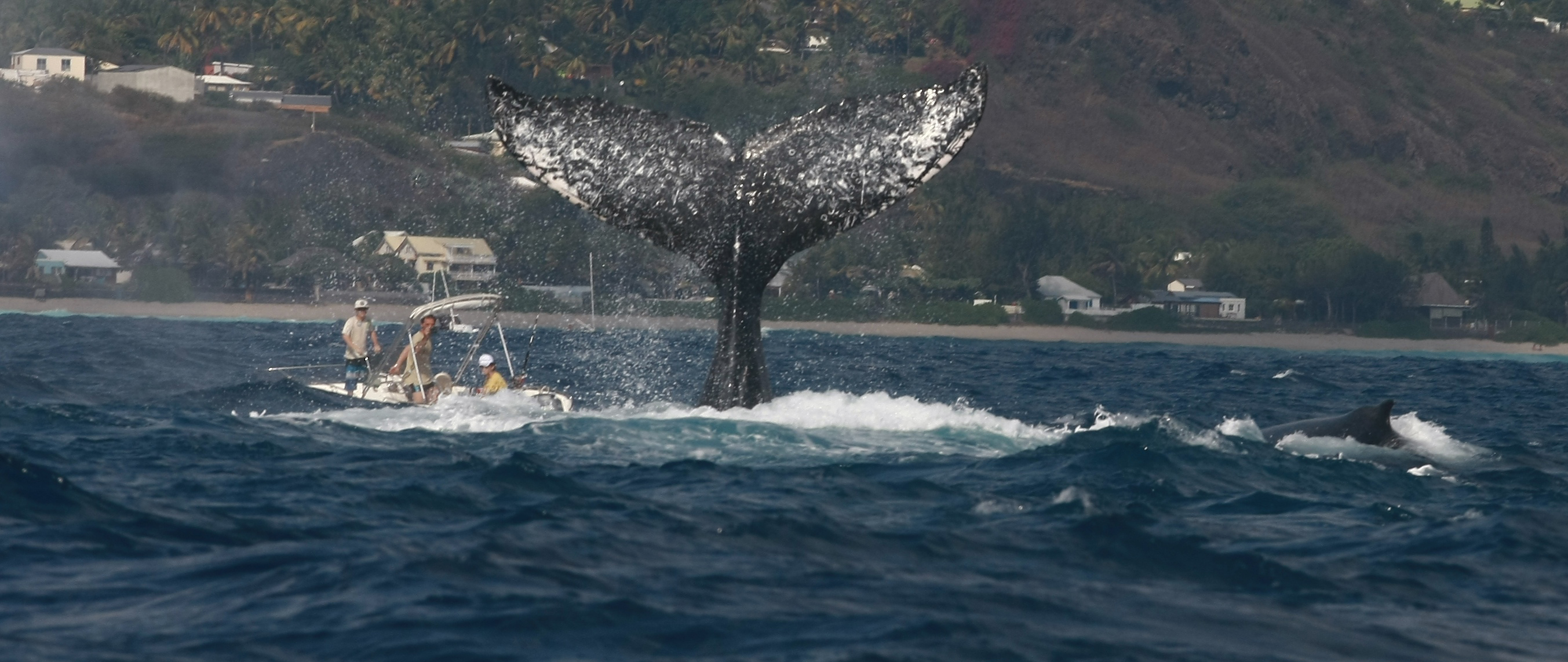
Humpback whales off Saint-Gilles, Réunion

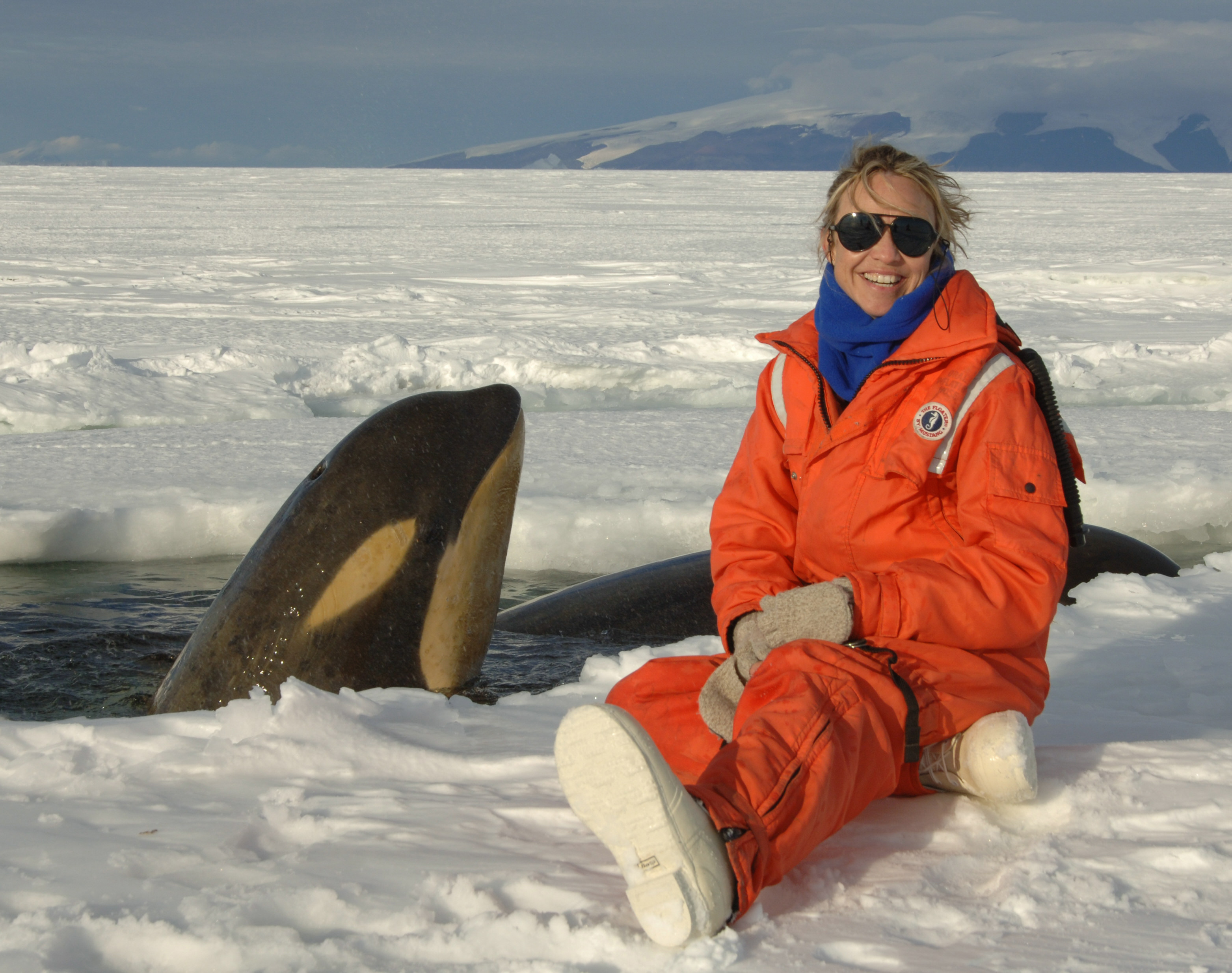
NOAA marine ecologist Lisa Ballance with a curious baby orca, possibly a new species. Southern Ross Sea, Antarctica.

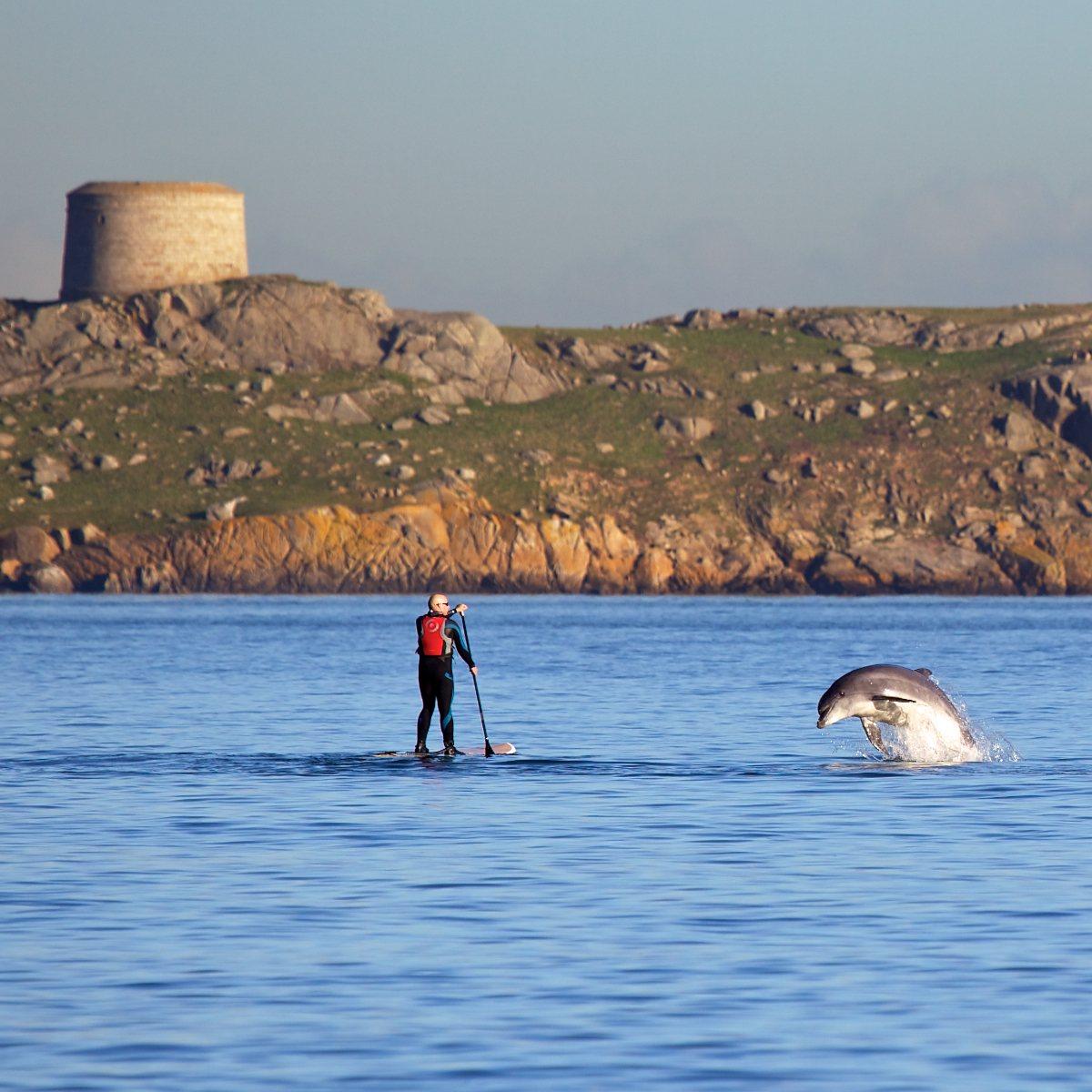
Bottlenose dolphin and a paddler at Dalkey Island

Whale watching is carried out on every continent, with an estimated 13 million people participating in 2008. This, when combined with the sustained increase in boat vessel traffic, has likely affected the surface activity of cetaceans. When boats and other whale watching vessels approach, most cetaceans will either avoid or seek interactions. The occasions where no effect is seen is predominantly when the cetaceans are travelling or feeding, but not when they are showing surface activity. In the case of avoidance, the animals may dive rather than staying submerged near the surface or move horizontally away from the vessels. For example, when sperm whales are approached by boats they surface less, shorten the intervals between breathes and do not show their fluke before diving as often. Cetaceans may also reduce their acrobatic surfacing behaviours, such as when humpback whale groups without calves are approached by vessels to within 300 m (980 ft). Avoidance behaviour is typical of whales, but interactions are more common in whale groups that contain calves and also in the smaller odontocetes. For example, studies on killer whales in North America have shown that the focal animals increased their tail-slapping behaviour when approached by boats within 100 m (330 ft), and that 70% of surface active behaviours (SABs) in these orca were seen when a boat was within 225 m (740 ft). Similarly, dusky dolphins also jump, change direction and form tighter groups more when boats are present, particularly when they do not adhere to the regulations about approach. As an increase in SABs is beneficial to the whale watching tours' participants, the tours may be encouraged to approach cetaceans closer than recommended by guidelines. There is a lack of understanding about the long-term effects of whale-watching on the behaviour of cetaceans, but it is theorised that it may cause avoidance of popular sites, or a decrease in the energy budget for individuals involved.

== See also ==
- Beached whale
- Tail-walking
- Aerial locomotion in marine animals
