= Sponging =

Sponging may refer to:

- Begging
- Sponge diving
- Tool use of sponges by bottlenose dolphins in Australia; see Cultural hitchhiking#In dolphins / Sponging (Cetacean Tool Use)
