= Shelling =

Shelling may refer to:

- Shell (projectile), explosive used in wars
- Searching for seashells
- Shelling (topology)
- Wheelset deformation, that occur when the wheel has been worn out
- Shelling (fishing), a fishing strategy used by dolphins.
