= Cultural hitchhiking =

Cultural hitchhiking is a hypothesized gene-culture coevolutionary process through which cultural selection, sexual selection based on cultural preference, limits the diversity at genetically neutral loci being transmitted in parallel to selective cultural traits. The process is thought to account for exceptionally low diversity in neutral loci such as control regions of the mitochondrial genome unaccounted for by any other selective forces. Simply put, selection for certain learned social and cultural behaviors can manifest in specific shaping of a population's genetic makeup. While the notion that culture plays a significant role in shaping community genetics is widely accepted in the context of human populations it had not been considered or documented in non-human organisms until the late 1990s. The term was coined by the cetologist Hal Whitehead who studies the cultures and population genetics of matrilineal whale communities.

Cultural hitchhiking has been proposed as a cause for reduced genetic diversity at certain loci in prehistoric Homo sapiens, dolphins, killer whales, and sperm whales.

Cultural hitchhiking is a significant hypothesis because it investigates the relationship between population genetics and culture. By understanding how social behavior can shape the genetic makeup of communities scientists are better able to explain why certain communities have genetic traits distinct from the larger population.

== In whales ==
The process was initially proposed by Whitehead in a 1998 paper as an explanation for the low genetic diversity in matrilineal whale species. In these communities, female individuals remain grouped together with their mothers and other female relatives. They appear to select mates from outside their immediate community based on culturally valued social traits and aptitude. Sequencing of the mitochondrial genome of individuals within these communities revealed them to have a significantly reduced diversity in certain control loci compared to comparable panmictic populations.

Whitehead discovered that the relative frequency of mitochondrial haplotypes characteristic of groups exhibiting more highly adaptive socially learned traits would increase, while the frequency of these haplotypes in groups with less adaptive socially learned traits would decrease. This coincidental selective pressure is thought to have led to an overall reduction in haplotype diversity across the entire species population.

== In dolphins ==
In 2014 a team of biologists from the University of South Wales attributed a remarkable geographic distribution of mitochondrial haplotypes among adjacent populations of bottlenose dolphins in a bay in Western Australia to cultural hitchhiking. The researchers found Whitehead's hypothesis that selection for learned social traits affected diversity in neutral gene loci fit well with their observations. It was discovered that dolphins with two of three mitochondrial haplotypes were found predominantly in water deeper than 10 m while those with the third haplotypes were found predominantly in depths less than 10 m. This geographic distinction between these populations is also associated with different learned behaviors.

Some of the dolphins predominantly found in deeper waters exhibit foraging strategies that implement tools such as a sponge placed on their beak. This "sponging" behavior is found to be spread through vertical social transmission along a matrilineal pattern (i.e. the mothers teach the behavior to their offspring). All dolphins exhibiting one of the deepwater haplotypes belong to a single matriline. The researchers ultimately concluded that these fine-scale genetic structures, the distinct mitochondrial haplotypes, have probably arisen based on socially transmitted behaviors or in other words, through cultural hitchhiking. A study in the same area and species showed that shelling is also marginally learned from associates.

== In early humans ==
Cultural hitchhiking has been proposed as an explanation for a widely inferred and abrupt Y-chromosome population bottleneck across several Old World (Africa, Europe, Asia) populations around 4000-6000 BC. This bottleneck is thought to suggest a significant decline in the effective male population during Neolithic times to an estimated 1/20th its original size. Though mitochondrial sequence records seem to indicate uninhibited population increase at this time meaning there was likely an extreme divergence in the size of male and female effective population sizes during the bottleneck period. A team of international genetics, archaeology, and anthropology researchers in a 2018 article hypothesized that the bottleneck was a consequence of intergroup competition between patrilineal kin groups, which caused cultural hitchhiking between Y-chromosomes and cultural groups and reduction in Y-chromosomal diversity.

The authors Zeng et al. argue that competition between patrilineal kin communities produces two mechanisms with limiting effect on Y-chromosome diversity. One mechanism being these patrilineal groups by virtue of common descent produce elevated levels of Y-chromosome homogeneity and high inter-group diversity. The second mechanism is violent inter-group competition which disproportionately results in male group member casualties and therefore concentration of like y-chronotypes and in some cases extinction complete extinction of entire lineages.
