= Valiant 40 =

Sailing boat designed by Robert Perry, it was introduced in 1973

The Valiant 40 was one of the first Sailboats designed by naval architect Robert Perry, it was introduced in 1973. The boat is configured as a rear cockpit double-ender, cutter rigged monohull.

The boat's design was considered revolutionary at that time by bringing aspects of racing design into open ocean cruising yachts which up to then meant heavy and slow traditional boats. The Valiant 40 is credited with birthing the category of the "performance cruiser". It was the first oceangoing cruising monohull to have a modified keel designed to reduce weight and wetted surface while increasing speed and ease of propulsion of the hull shape by the wind. At least three Valiant 40s were built with centerboards.

At some point in 1976, a new type of resin with the trade name "Hetron" was used in the fiberglass layup. The new resin was designed to be fire retardant, and was originally developed to the specifications of the US military late in the Vietnam War. It is widely suspected that the new resin was responsible for extensive non-osmotic blistering of the hulls, deck, and cabin-house structures in boats built between 1976 and 1981.

Many of the "blister boats" were "repaired" by stripping the outer layers of fiberglas off the exterior of the hull (either undersides and topsides, or just undersides below the water line). The repair then involved drying out the stripped hull for several months (commonly in the California or Mexico desert), followed by reglassing the exterior with several layers of fiberglas with vinylester resin or polyester resin. However many of the blisters have returned on "blister boats" (hull Nos 120 to 249) despite major repairs.

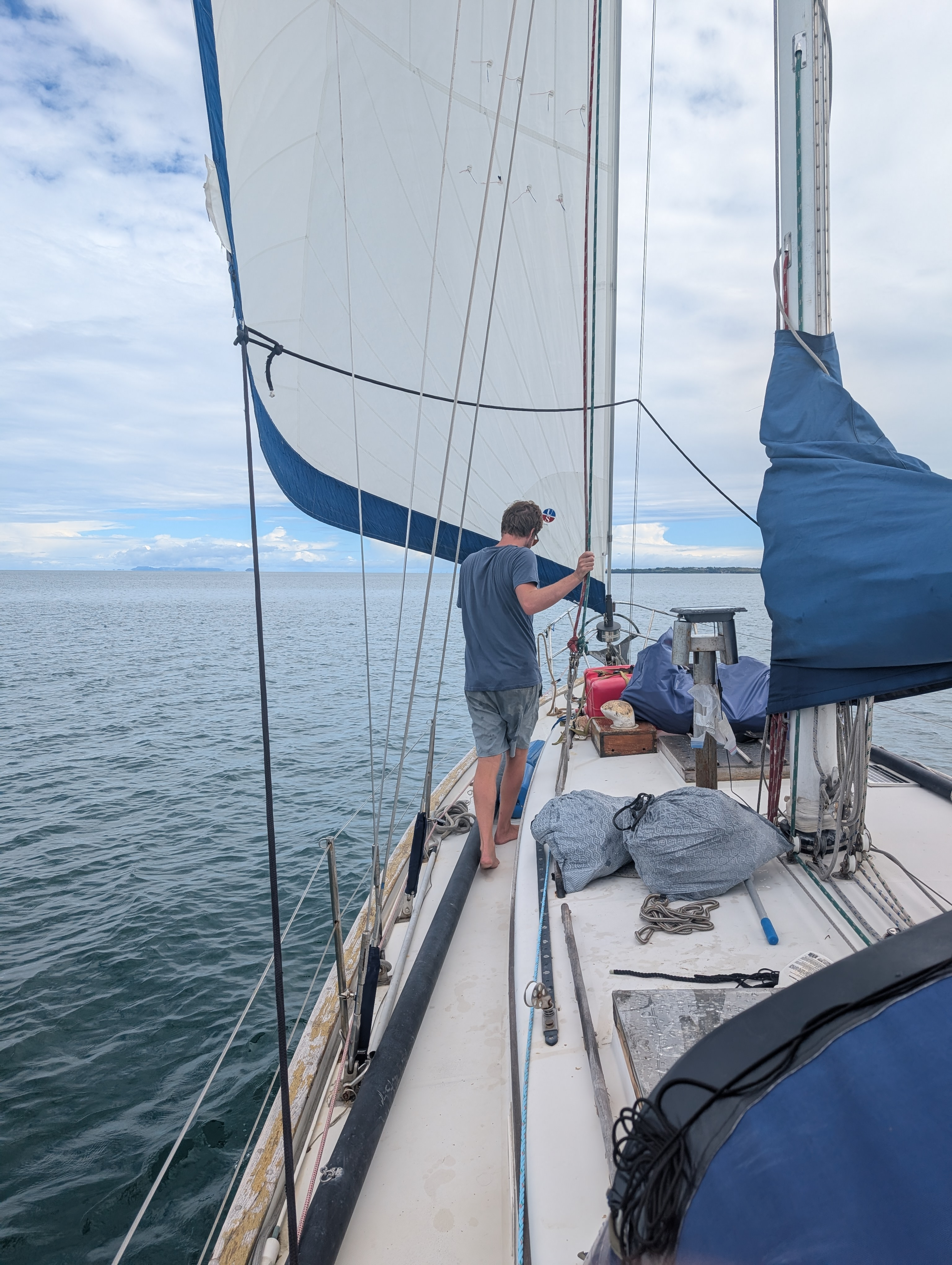
Man holding the rigging on a Valiant 40 near Fiji

The success of several Valiant 40s competing in long ocean races during the early 1980s brought this boat to the notice of the world sailing community. Of special importance was a solo "wrong way" race completed in the Southern Ocean on a Westabout course, sailing into the prevailing winds, using a factory-stock V-40. Many cruising couples have made successful transoceanic voyages and Valiant 40s are reported to turn 160-mile (256 km) days regularly on a passage.

After litigation and other business difficulties forced the end of production of the Valiant 40 in Washington, a broker who had sold Valiants bought the molds for the boat and continued production in Texas near the shore of Lake Texoma. The Valiant 40 has been slightly redesigned to become the Valiant 42, which continued in production for 35 years. Valiant Yachts has also manufactured 32 foot, 37 foot, 39 foot, 47 foot, and 50 foot models.

Production of Valiant Yachts ceased in early 2011. www.texomalakefest.com/articles/sailing-july-2011.pdf

The Valiant 40 was elected to the American Sailboat Hall of Fame in 1997 and was named Cruising Sailboat of the Decade.

== Valiant 40 Photos ==
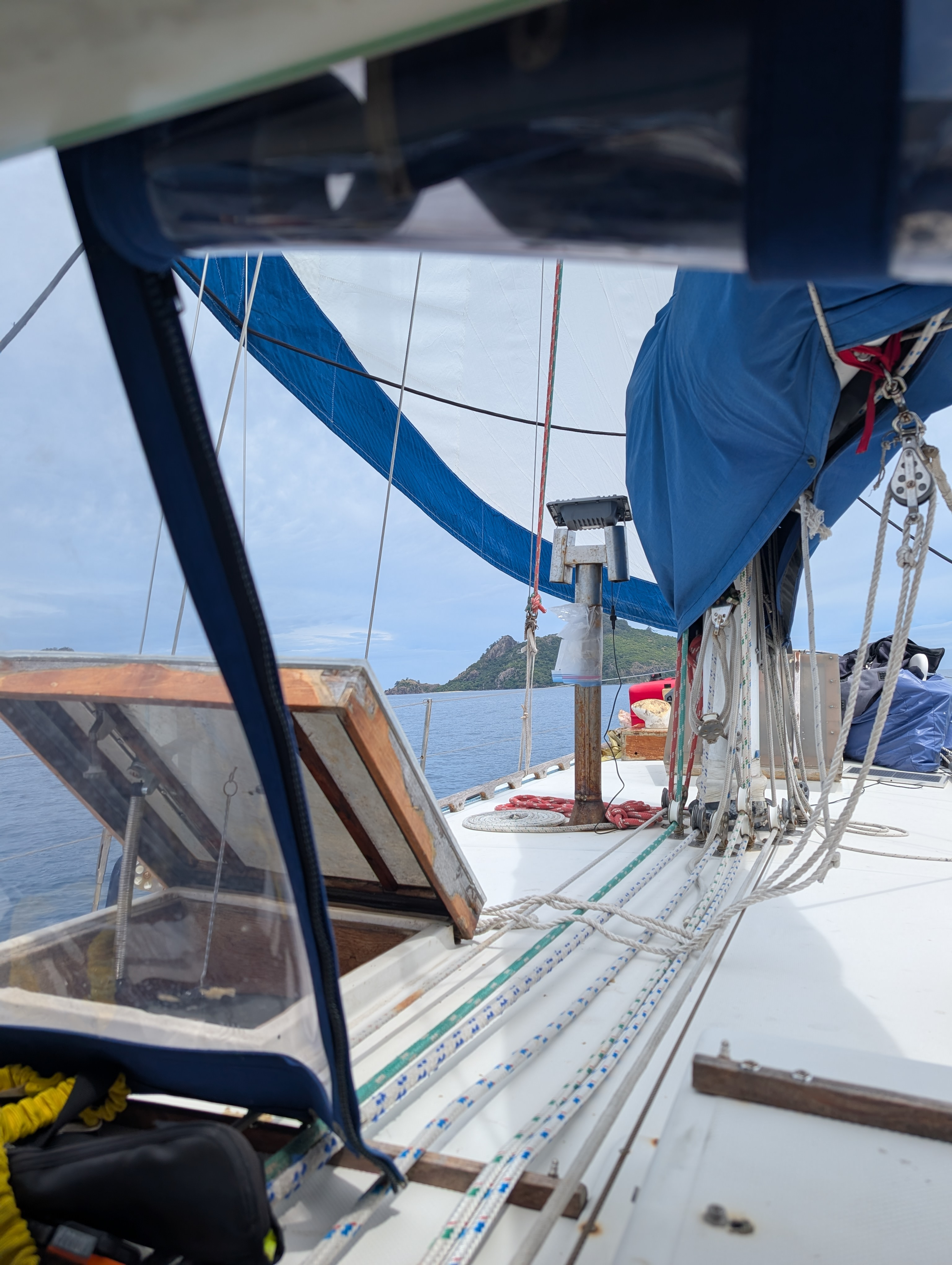
Deck and hatch on Valiant 40 sailing near Fiji

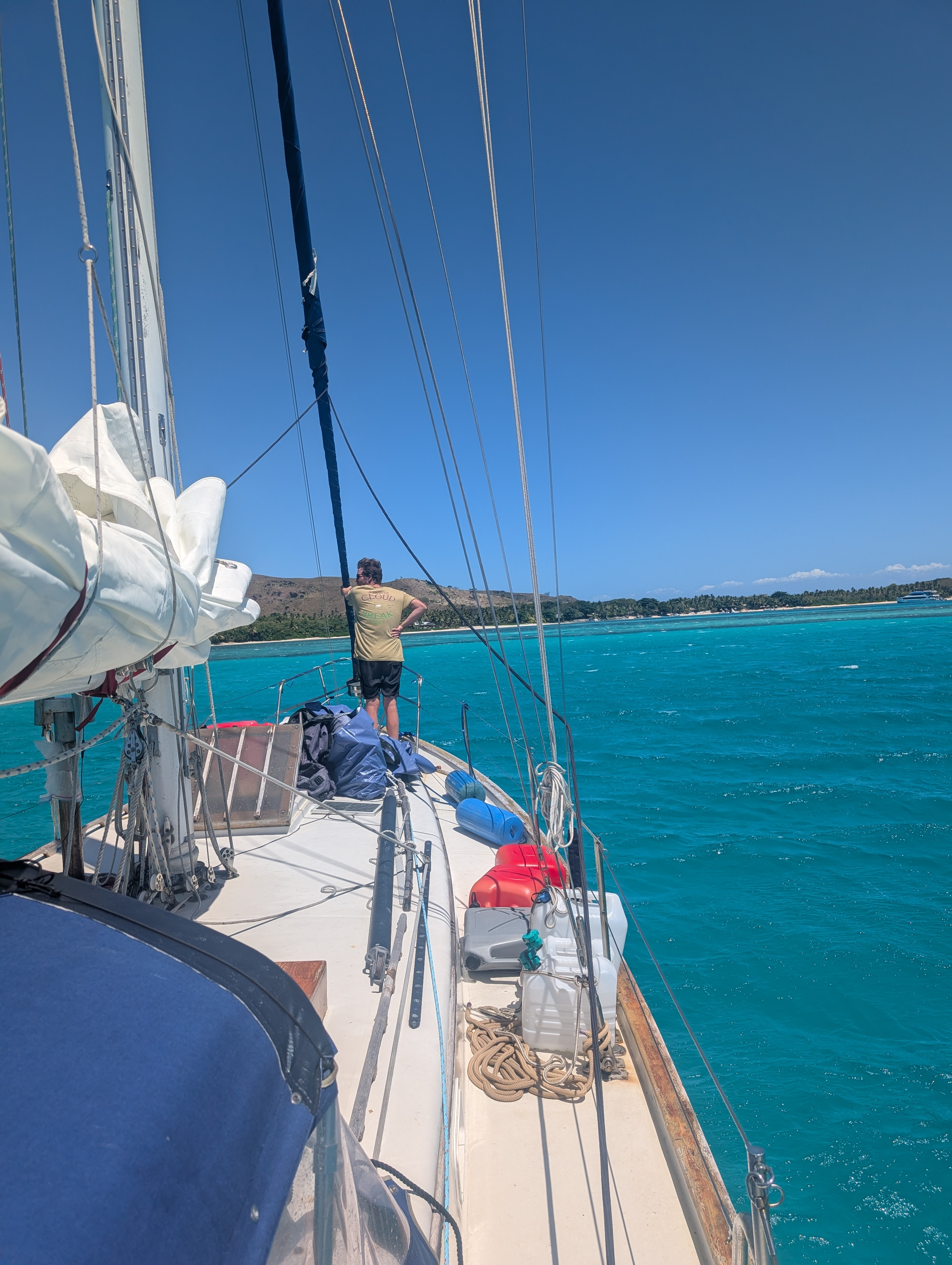
Man at the bow of a Valiant 40 sailboat near Fiji

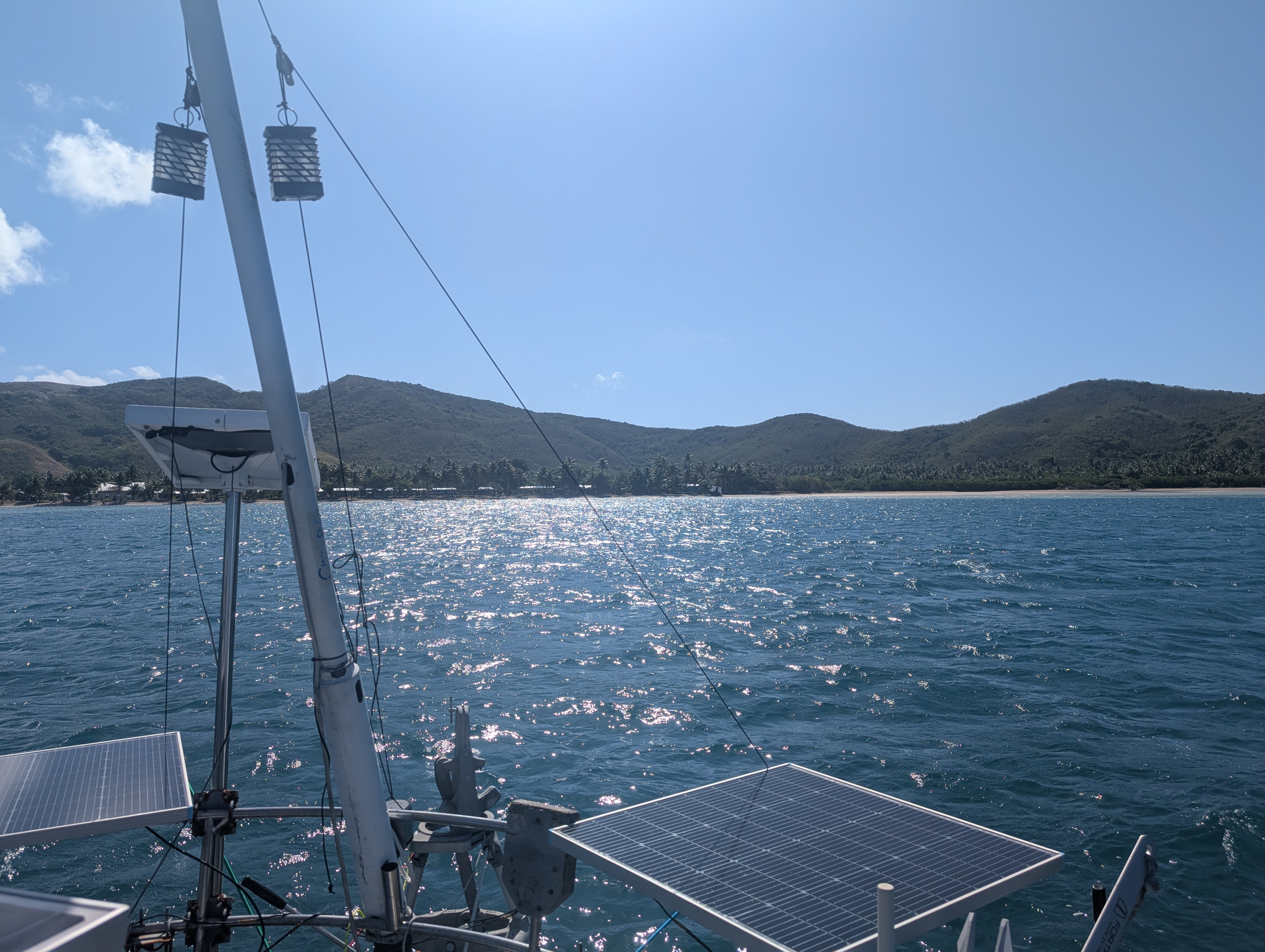
Solar pannels on a Valiant 40 sailboat near Yanggeta Island

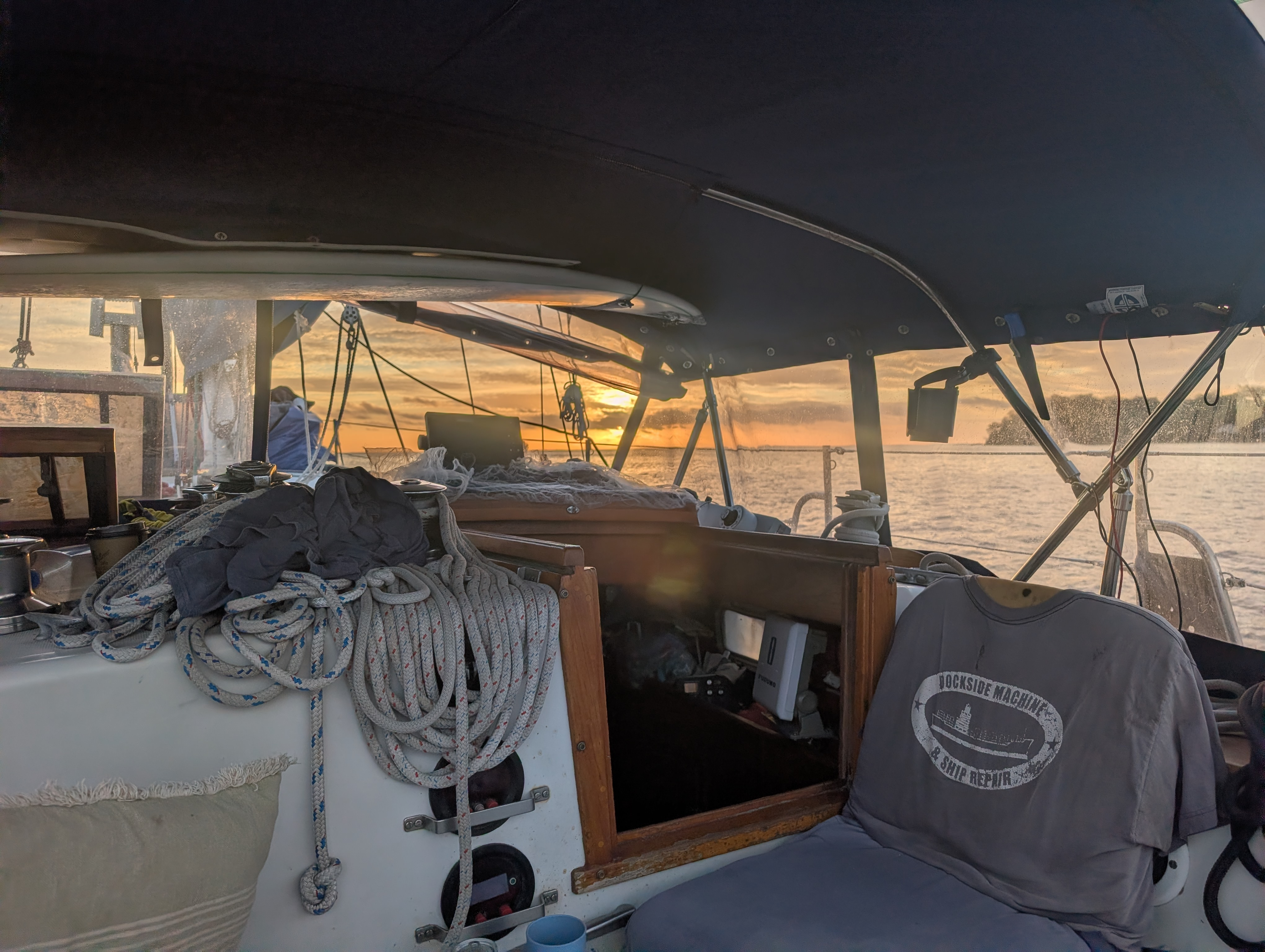
Sunset off the bow of a Valiant 40 near Fiji
