= Osmotic blistering =

Chemical phenomenon

Osmotic blistering is a chemical phenomenon where two substances attempt to reach equilibrium through a semi-permeable membrane. The phenomenon appears as a bubble or "blister" in the coating.

== Overview ==
Water will flow from one solution to another, trying to create equilibrium between both solutions. Usually, the two solutions are concrete and the coating application on top of the concrete. Concrete is very porous, so water beneath the concrete, will force itself through the concrete, typically through vapor transmission. The water will then try to break through the semi-permeable membrane (either the surface of the concrete or the primer). Most epoxies or urethanes or polymer applications are not permeable so the water will stop at the polymer coating. However, the pressure from the water does not stop, forcing the water to collect directly in between the concrete and the layer of epoxy/urethane. This collection creates the notorious “osmotic blister” that is commonly feared by coating specialists.

For steel substrates: The presence of soluble salts (particularly sulfates and chlorides) at the metal/paint interface is known to have a detrimental effect on the integrity of most paint systems including fluorocoatings. The salts come from atmospheric pollution and contamination during blasting or other substrate preparation processes. These salts promote osmotic blistering of the coating and underfilm metallic corrosion. As a result, loss of adhesion, cathodic disbondment, and scribe creep can be observed.

A coating behaves as a semi-impermeable membrane; allowing moisture to pass through but not salts4,5. When a paint coating is applied on a metallic surface contaminated with soluble salts, an osmotic blistering process takes place (Figure 8.10). Osmosis is the spontaneous net movement of solvent molecules (water) through a semipermeable membrane (coating film) into a region of higher solute concentration (the salt contaminated substrate). The process drives to equalize the solute concentrations on the two sides, but because salt cannot pass through the membrane (coating) it can never equalize. Water continues to permeate into the region. As the soluble substance dissolves under the paint layer, the pressure caused by the increase in volume can exert a greater force than the paint adhesion and cohesion forces, giving rise to the formation of a blister; the process called osmotic blistering. The blisters are first filled with water and later with corrosion products from the corrosion of the metallic substrate.

== See also ==
- Osmosis
