= Hal Whitehead =

Canadian biologist

Hal Whitehead is a biologist specializing in the study of the sperm whale (Physeter macrocephalus). Whitehead is professor at Dalhousie University. The primary field research vessel of his laboratory is the Balaena, a Valiant 40 ocean-going cruising boat, which normally does its work off the coast of Nova Scotia. Other marine mammals studied by Whitehead's laboratory include beluga whales, pilot whales, northern bottlenose whales, and bottlenose dolphins. Whitehead is a preeminent scholar in the field of cetacean research and specifically the acoustical abilities of sperm whales, which underlie a complex social organization.

== Research findings ==
Whitehead's research is focused primarily upon the behavior, population biology, and ecology of the sperm whale. Topics include social structure, cultural transmission of behavior, as well as acoustic communicative behavior such as click trains.

== Selected publications ==
- Whitehead, H. (2003). Sperm Whales: Social Evolution in the Ocean. 456 p., 60 halftones, 84 line drawings, 41 tables. 6 x 9. Chicago: University of Chicago Press.
- Whitehead, H. and Luke Rendell. (2014). The Cultural Lives of Whales and Dolphins. 408 p., 15 color plates, 7 halftones, 4 line drawings, 5 tables. 6 x 9. Chicago: University of Chicago Press, ISBN 978-0-22632-592-7.

== See also ==
- Beaked whale
- Sperm whale
