= Shelling (fishing) =

Hunting behavior in Dolphins

Shelling (or conching) is a rare, tool-based foraging strategy observed in bottlenose dolphins (Tursiops sp.). This behavior includes dolphins driving prey into an empty conch shell, and then pouring the shell’s contents into its mouth.

== History ==
The behavior have been observed in bottlenose dolphin after a survey on Shark Bay since 2007 by collecting both genetic and behavioral data for more than 1,000 dolphins. Nineteen dolphins have been observed to use the shelling strategy a total of forty-two times. The shelling strategy is rarely observed and may be a new foraging strategy developed by bottlenose dolphins.

== Transmission of behavior ==
Research has shown that the shelling behavior spreads not only via a mother-to-calf bonding, but through peer interaction as well. Dolphins have been shown to primarily use mother-to-calf interaction as a learning mechanism, and peer-to-peer behavioral influence is rarely seen.

== Implications of the discovery ==
=== Tool use in aquatic life ===
Tool use in regards to animal behavior can be defined as objects, nor a part of the animal itself, which are repeatedly manipulated. Tool use has most commonly been observed in land animals, and is rarely seen in aquatic life. This is not necessarily due to a lack of ability, but rather a lack of need. For example, even though dolphins have larger brains compared to primates, and could thus be expected to engage in more tool-use foraging behavior, they have other methods like echolocation for attaining resources. Still, conching is just one example of tool use found in dolphins.

=== Inter-species cultural similarities ===
Dolphins are not the only animals who demonstrate peer-to-peer behavior transmission. It can be seen in members of the Hominidae family, which suggests similarities in culture. Research has suggested that these cultural similarities may stem from the comparable life history characteristics, cognitive abilities, and social systems between the great apes and dolphins. Specifically, both great apes and dolphins live in highly social communities, which enables considerable levels of social interaction. These high levels of social interaction have been shown to be important in the transmission of socially learned foraging behavior.

== See also ==
- Cultural hitchhiking#In dolphins (sponging)
- Allokelping
