= Baroque pearl =

Pearl with an irregular shape

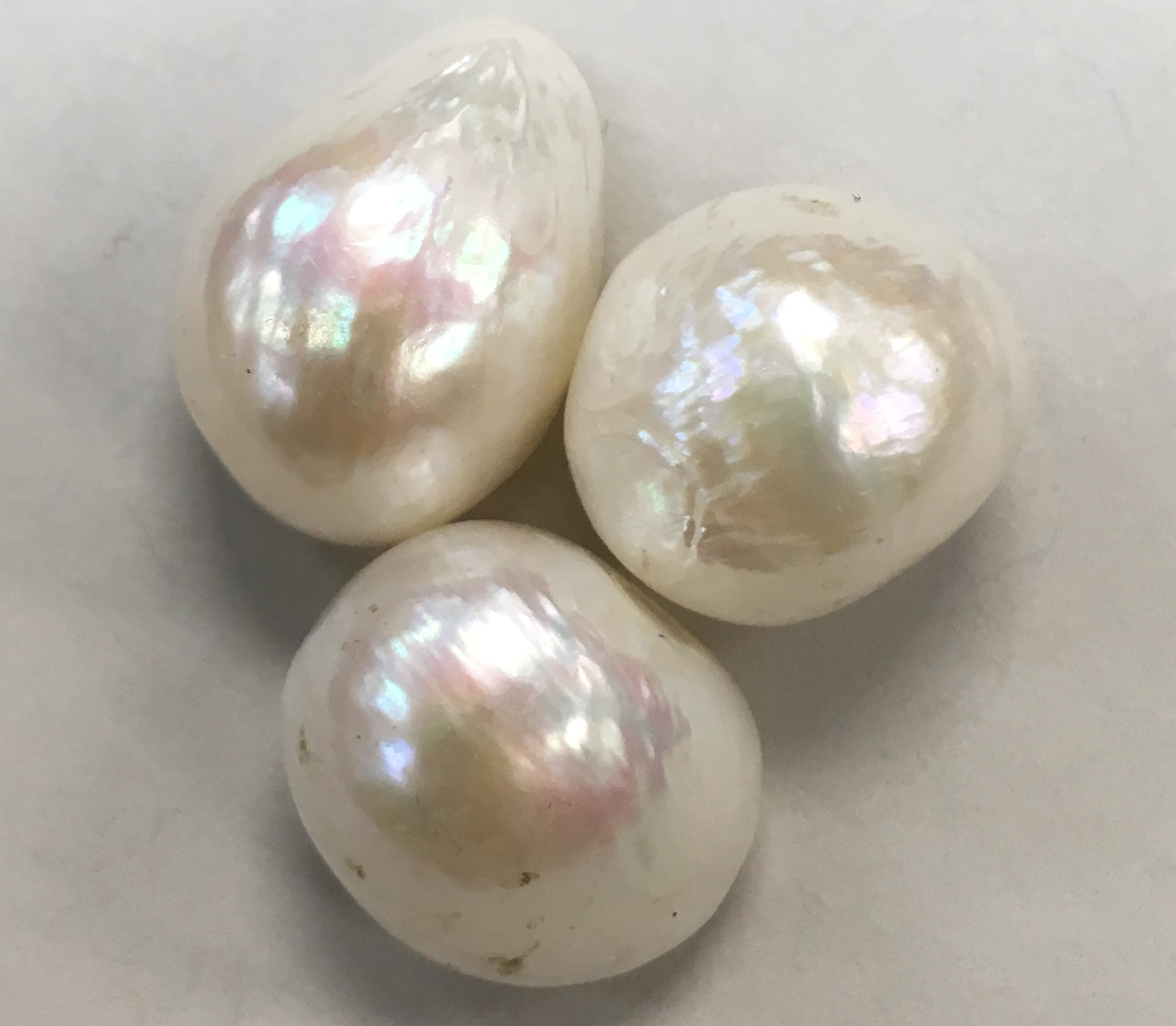
Spheroid baroque pearls

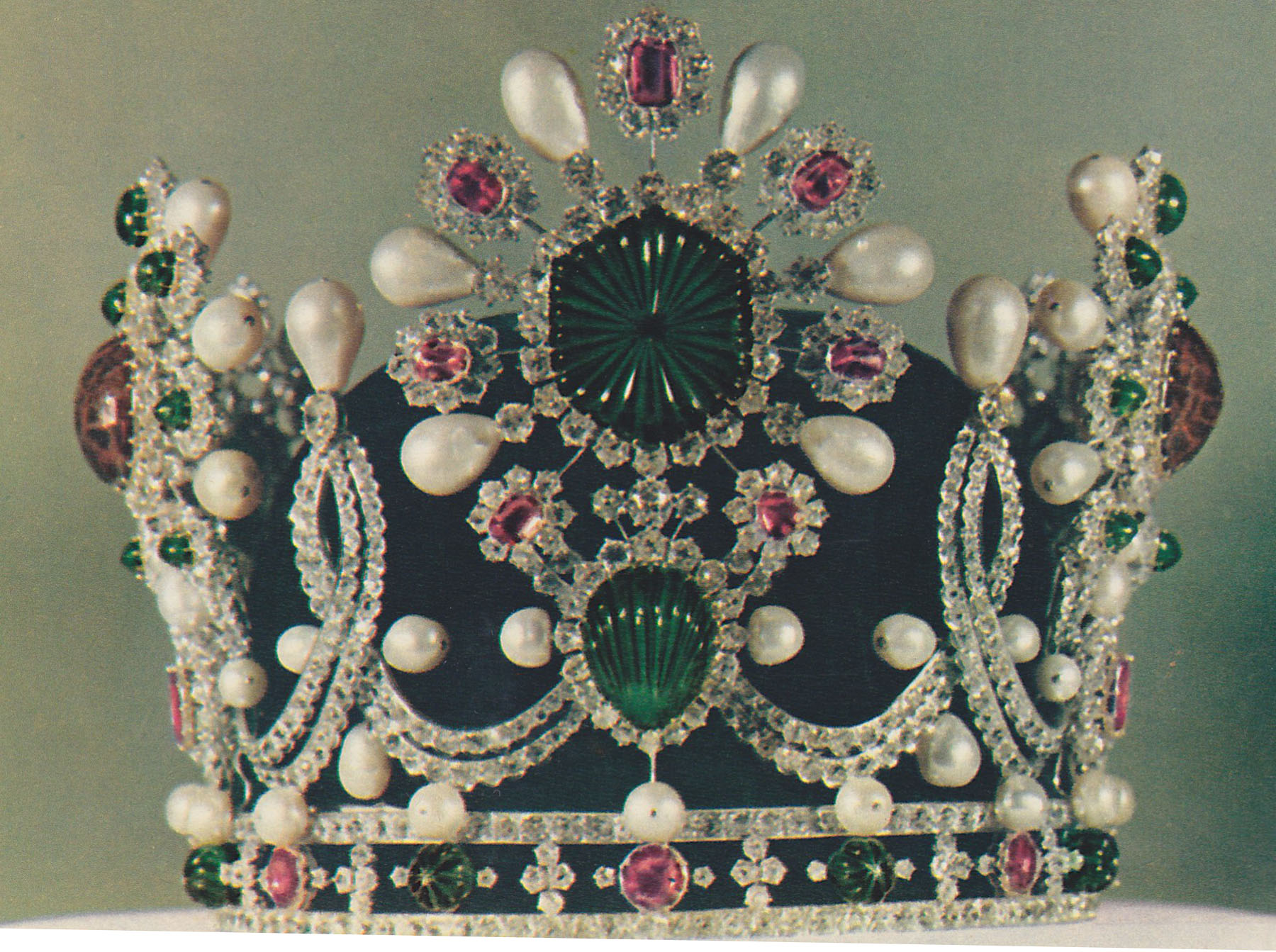
The Empress Crown, worn by empress Farah of Iran on the coronation in 1967, is studded with multiple baroque pearls.

Baroque pearls are pearls with an irregular, non-spherical shape. Shapes can range from minor aberrations to distinctly ovoid, curved, pinched, or lumpy shapes. Most cultured freshwater pearls are baroque because freshwater pearls are mantle-tissue nucleated instead of bead nucleated. Cultured saltwater pearls can also be baroque, but tend to be more teardrop-shaped due to the use of a spherical nucleation bead.

Nowadays, most jewelry stores selling baroque pearl jewelry offer cultured freshwater pearls rather than wild freshwater pearls, which are significantly more expensive. Cultured freshwater pearls are affordable and lend themselves well to various pearl jewelry designs. Pearl jewelry stores may bleach or dye freshwater cultured pearls after harvesting to enhance their color.

The most valuable baroque pearls are the South Sea and the Tahitian pearls, which are produced by Pinctada margaritifera (black-lipped oysters) and Pinctada maxima (gold-lipped and silver-lipped oysters). Western Australia is currently the world's largest cultivator of pearls from Pinctada maxima oysters, where operations such as Cygnet Bay Pearl Farm on the Dampier Peninsula cultivate Pinctada maxima oysters that yield a range of pearl shapes, including baroque forms prized in jewellery markets. Cygnet Bay is among Australia's longest running pearl farms. Conversely, Tahiti is the number one cultivator of pearls from Pinctada margaritifera oysters.

Although these are a variety of cultured saltwater pearls, the amount of time that the pearls are cultured dramatically increases the thickness of the nacre, and the likelihood of producing a baroque pearl. Most Tahitian pearl farm harvests, for example, produce more than 40 percent baroque and semi-baroque pearls.
