= P. imbricata =

P. imbricata may refer to:

- Phacelia imbricata, a plant species native to much of California and Baja California
- Pinctada imbricata, a synonym for Pinctada fucata, the Akoya pearl oyster, a species in the genus Pinctada found in the Red Sea, Sri Lanka, Persian Gulf, Indian Ocean, Western Pacific Ocean, Australia and China
- Pitcairnia imbricata, a plant species native to Mexico

== See also ==
- Imbricata
