= Enconchado =

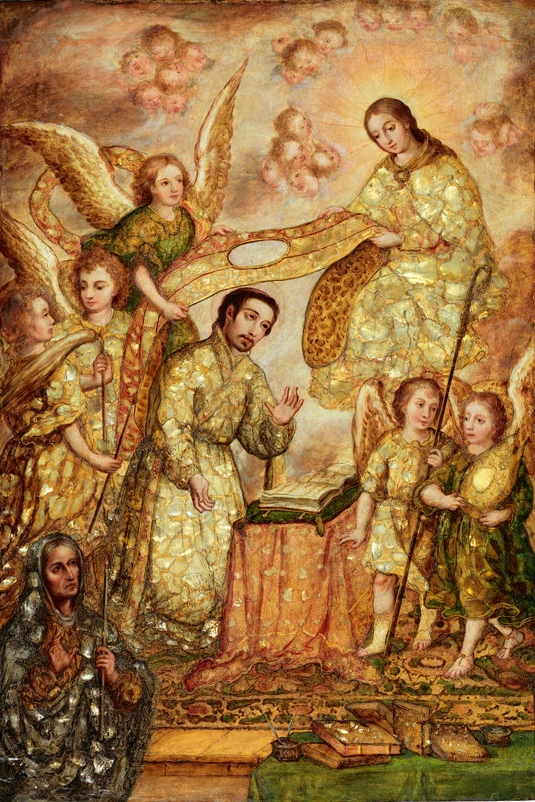
La imposición de la Casulla a San Ildefonso. Nicolás Correa. LACMA, Los Angeles.

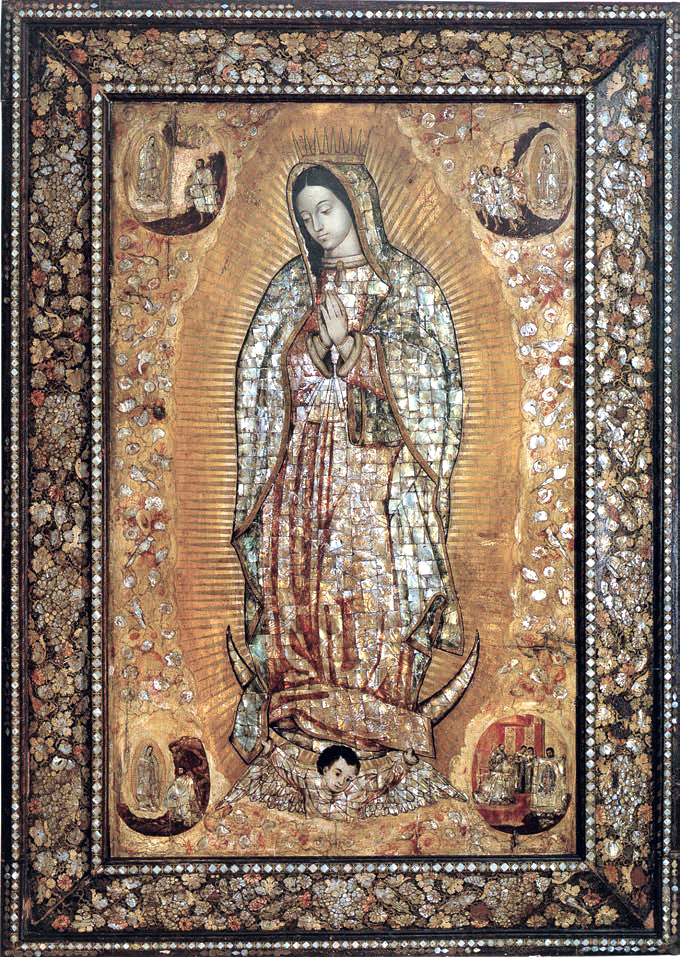
Virgen de Guadalupe, unknown author, Convent of the Precious Blood, Castellón de la Plana, Spain.

The term enconchado refers to a mixed media artistic technique based on nacre (mother-of-pearl) inlays and oil paint used in the Viceroyalty of New Spain during the seventeenth and eighteenth centuries. It refers primarily to paintings, but encompasses a limited number of furniture samples. Possibly inspired by Japanese nanban art, enconchado painting combined the iridescence of mother-of-pearl with layers of paint and varnish to achieve the desired pigment.

The González family originated the technique and produced its most prominent examples in modern-day Mexico. Siblings Juan and Miguel produced the Conquest of Mexico series, which included 24 inlaid panels gifted to Charles II of Spain. Most other extant paintings are religious in nature and unsigned. When the Gonzálezes ceased production no later than 1740, their technique fell into obscurity.

== History ==
=== Definition ===
The word enconchado is a modern term not found in contemporary sources. It derives from concha (seashell). In the 1950s, Manuel Toussaint used such terms as láminas embutidas (inlaid panels), tableros de concha (shell panels), and embutidas de concha (inlaid with shell). The definition of what is now termed enconchado evolved from one inclusive of materials like ivory and tortoiseshell to a focus on mother-of-pearl, a light-reflecting material found on mollusks. Aside from mother-of-pearl, enconchado paintings are defined by their decorative frames. The inlay technique saw limited use in furniture as well.

Enconchado paintings were likely inspired by Japanese nanban art, but used European-influenced painting techniques rather than lacquer. They also employed mother-of-pearl to convey light reflections on, for example, armor and angels' wings and rarely used it for faces. The variety of colors and the painting of the mother-of-pearl differentiate them from other styles of inlay.

=== Origin ===
The precise origin of enconchado techniques is unclear. Their invention was tied to the exchange of goods and ideas between Asia, the Americas, and Europe, to the point Rodrigo Rivero Lake speculated that the creators were Japanese immigrants — a thesis disputed by other scholars. The consolidation of the Philippines as part of the Hispanic Monarchy and the discovery of a trade route between Manila and Acapulco by gave rise to the Manila galleon in the second half of the 16th century, carrying silver bullion bound for China and returning with furniture, porcelain, and textiles from Asia. By 1573, it brought Japanese nanban art, a name meaning "Southern barbarians" because inlaid lacquerware was intended for both export and use by European missionaries in Japan.

Japanese art became a common sight in New Spain between 1600 and 1650. Through increased global trade, it influenced artists in China and India as well as Europe. What makes enconchados unusual is that the nanban lacquerware to which they bear a striking resemblance ceased production several decades before their creation, when Japan closed its borders. Although the earliest examples may have been furniture inspired by nanban book stands, more evidence is needed. Villaseñor Black emphasizes the diverse stream of influences in the global trade network and states, "More importantly, enconchados seem to constitute new inventions by artists in New Spain."

Production lasted from about 1660 to 1740. Little is known about Tomás González, the first artist dedicated to enconchados. His sons, Juan and Miguel, produced the most prominent examples. The 1690s and first decades of the 18th century saw other artists use the technique before its decline.

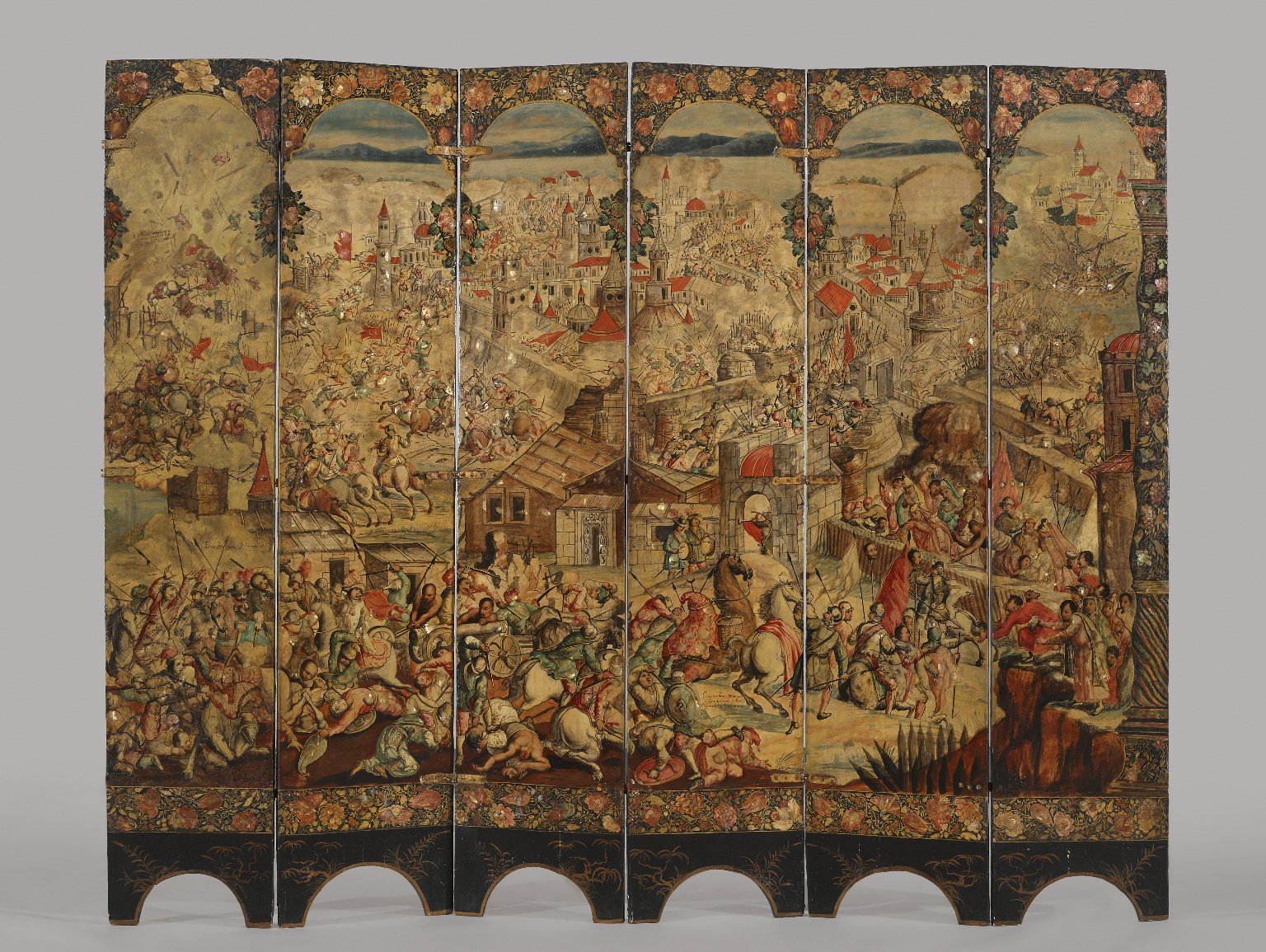
An atypical example of the enonchado technique depicting the Siege of Belgrade, (c. 1697-1701) Brooklyn Museum, New York.

== Technique ==
Mother-of-pearl (nacre) forms when layers of calcium carbonate form a reflective surface on the interior of mollusk shells. The shells likely came from Pinctada mazatlanica off the western Mexican coast in Baja California and perhaps Oaxaca. A 2024 analysis of the Adoration of the Magi held by the Metropolitan Museum of Art noted that local mother-of-pearl, a byproduct of pearl harvesting, would have been cheaper for the González family, but it could not rule out a comparable Asian species such as Pinctada margaritifera. It also noted the presence of perforations on the nacre, with one possible explanation repurposed shells from pre-Hispanic works.

Nanban art involved up to 200 coats of varnish. Enconchados used a mixture of paint and varnish to achieve a similar effect. Before painting, the weight of mother-of-pearl required wooden boards to be used as supports, which were sometimes canvased in linen. A thin layer of plaster was applied to the board and the scene to be represented was drawn. Successive layers of paint and varnish created the desired pigment while preserving the material's natural iridescence. The result could enhance depictions of draperies and brocade.

== Extant works ==
There are nearly 400 documented enconchado paintings, the majority depicting religious scenes. Most are believed to have been produced for local consumption in viceregal New Spain with the largest no taller than four feet. Many surviving examples have lost their distinctive frames.

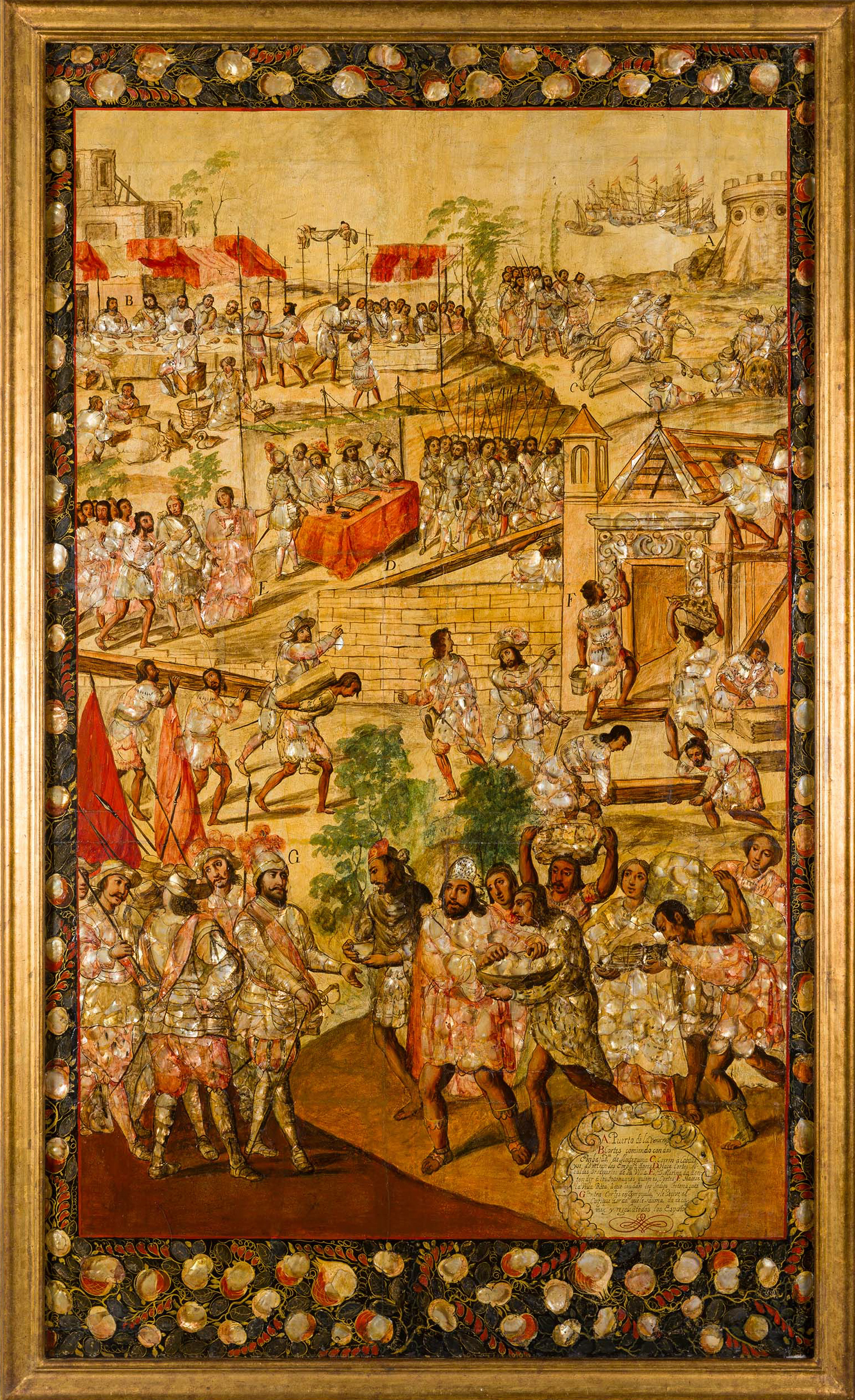
Unsigned panel depicting Cortés, Museo de América, Madrid.

Juan and Miguel González produced a notable series of panels depicting the Spanish conquest of the Aztec Empire, commonly known as the Conquest of Mexico series. Five known series exist, commissioned for wealthy patrons in Europe. By the 20th century, four resided in Europe and the fifth in the Americas. This latter series of 24 panels, signed by Miguel, is held by the Museo Nacional de Bellas Artes in Buenos Aires with the exception of some panels in private collections. Another, held by the National Museum of Archaeology in Madrid, was preserved at the Museo de América. The Prado holds a 24-panel series gifted to Charles II of Spain as part of the Royal Collection, notably signed by both brothers. It was displayed at the Museo de América in 2023 along with six panels from that museum's collection and a series of 24 commissioned by José Sarmiento de Valladares, 1st Duke of Atrisco, viceroy of New Spain. Valladares also commissioned the only folding screen examples of the enconchado technique, depicting the Siege of Vienna and the Siege of Belgrade.

Nicolás Correa, nephew of the painter Juan Correa, is among the only other known authors. Correa's signed depiction of the Wedding at Cana in 1696 is currently held by the Hispanic Society of America. Agustín del Pino produced at least three enconchados, notably depicting Saint Francis Xavier, while Pedro López Calderón is another known name and little is known about the artist who signed a Virgin of Guadalupe painting as Rudolpho. The Virgin of Guadalupe, a figure of considerable importance in what is now Mexico, is the most common subject of religious-themed enconchados.

== Gallery ==
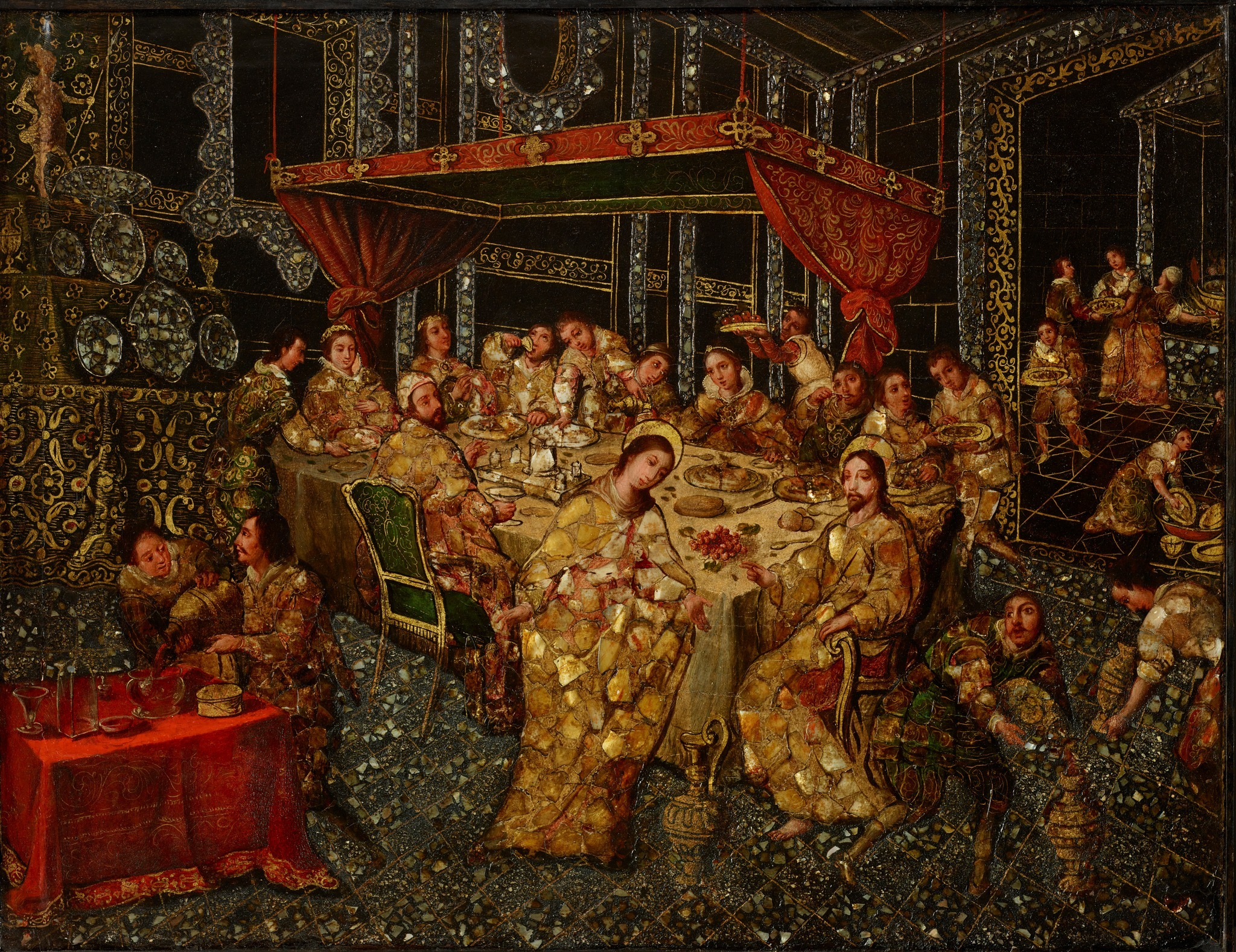
Las bodas de Caná, Nicolás Correa, Hispanic Society of America, New York.

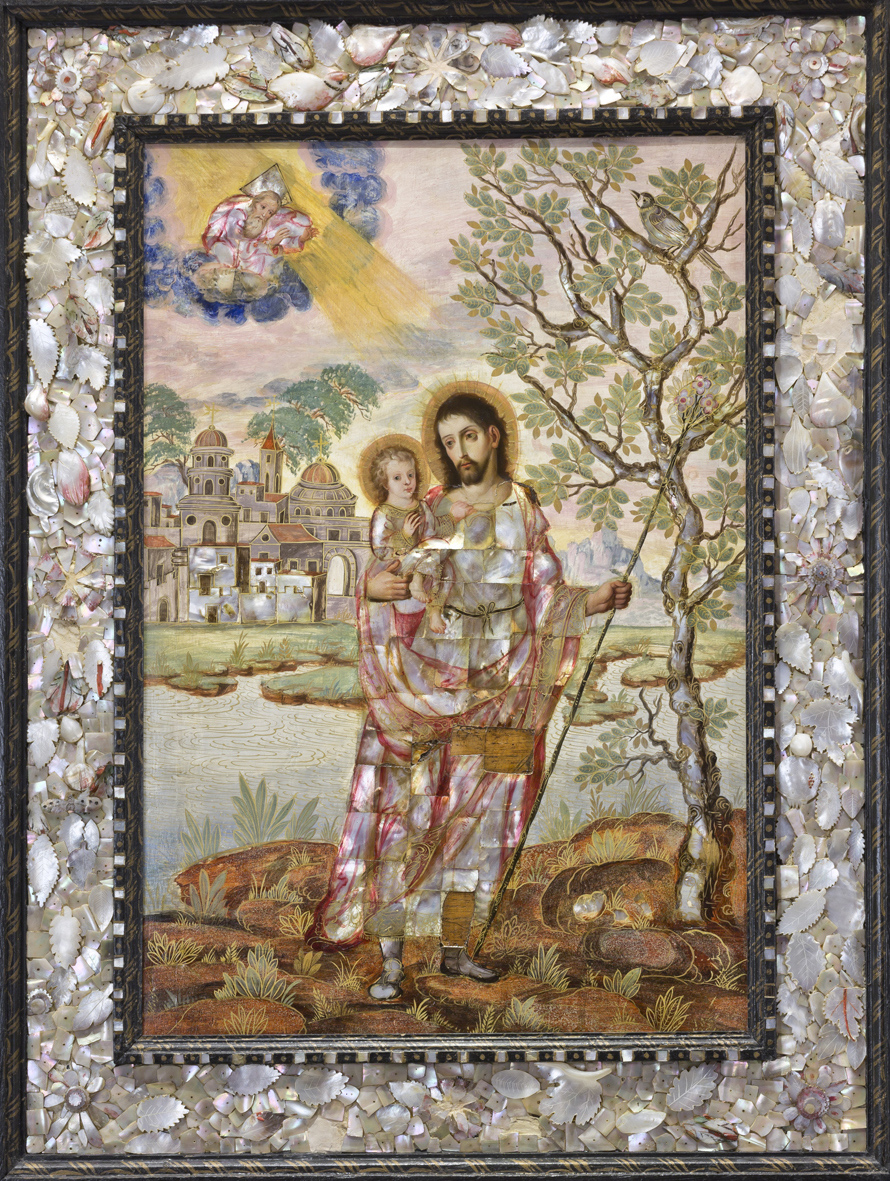
San José con el Niño Jesús, unknown author, Royal Collections Gallery, Madrid.

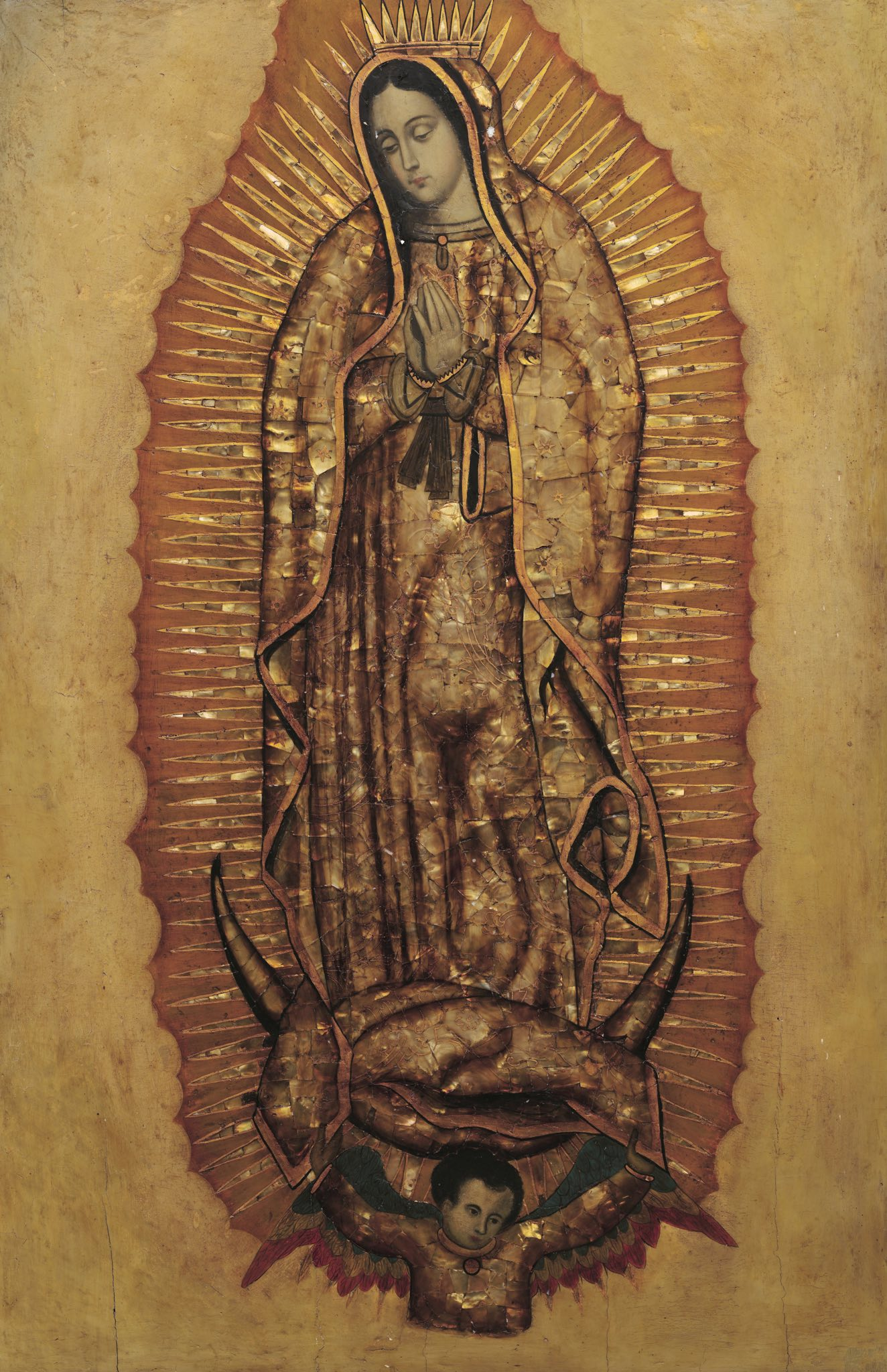
Virgen de Guadalupe, unknown author, Museo Franz Mayer, Mexico City.

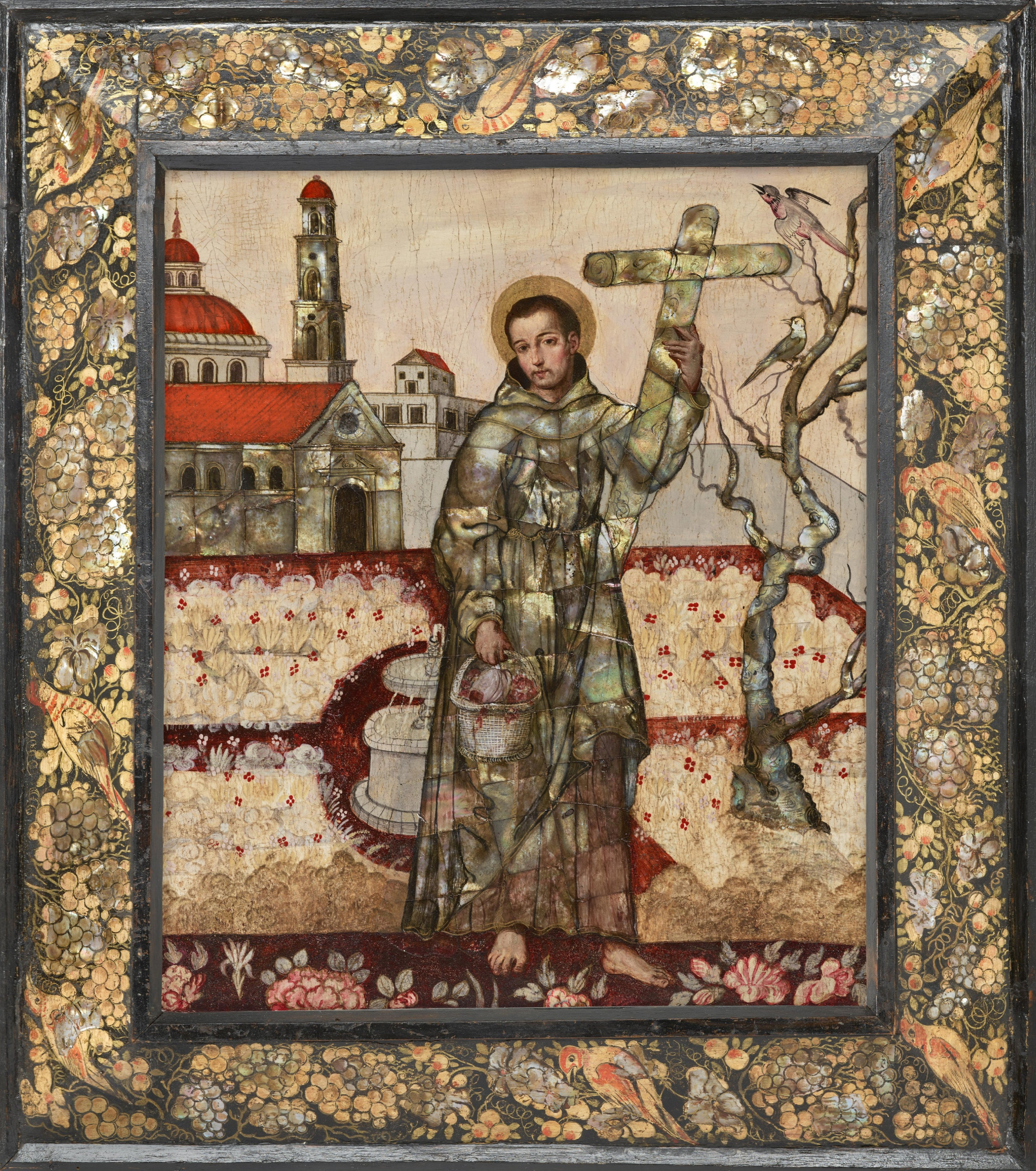
San Diego de Alcalá, unknown author, Philadelphia Museum of Art, Philadelphia, PA.

== See also ==
- Nanban art
