= Cultured pearl =

Pearl created under human-controlled conditions

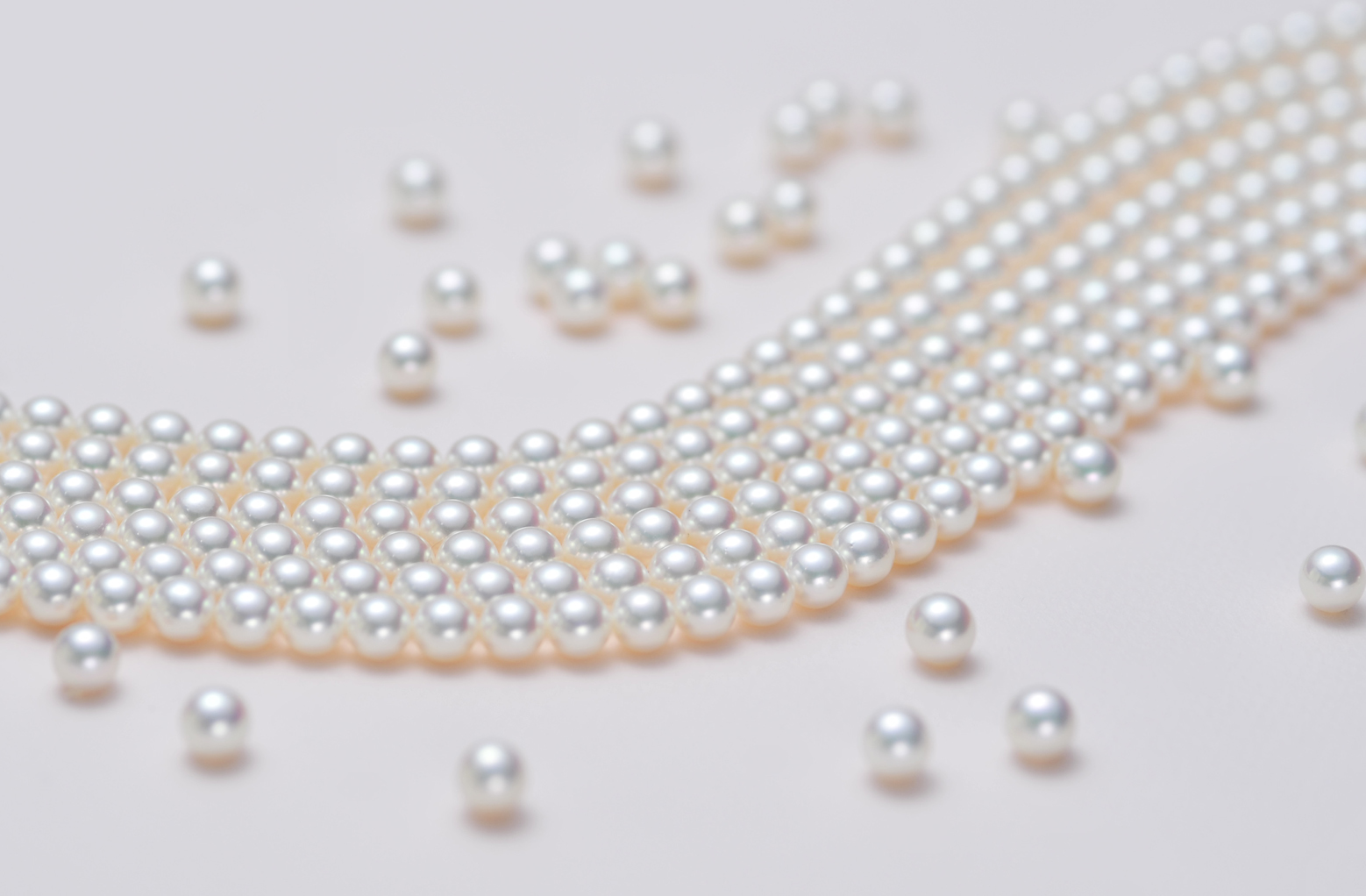
Cultured akoya pearls

Cultured pearls are pearls which are formed within a cultured pearl sac with human intervention in the interior of productive living molluscs in a variety of conditions depending upon the mollusc and the goals. Having the same material as natural pearls, cultured pearls can be cultivated in seawater or freshwater bodies. Over 95% of the pearls available on the market are cultured pearls.

== Development of a pearl ==
Cross-section of a cultured and a natural pearl

A pearl is formed when the mantle tissue is injured by a parasite, an attack of a fish, or another event that damages the external fragile rim of the shell of a mollusk bivalve or gastropod. In response, the mantle tissue of the mollusk secretes nacre into the pearl sac, a cyst that forms during the healing process. Chemically speaking, this is calcium carbonate and a fibrous protein called conchiolin. As the nacre builds up in layers of minute aragonite tablets, it fills the growing pearl sac and eventually forms a pearl.

Natural pearls are initiated in nature more or less by chance, but cultured pearls are human-initiated, formed by inserting a tissue graft from a donor mollusk, upon which a pearl sac forms, and the inner side precipitates calcium carbonate, in the form of nacre or "mother-of-pearl".

The most popular and effective method for creating cultured pearls utilizes the shells of freshwater river mussels harvested in the Midwestern U.S., from Canada to the Gulf of Mexico. Shells with the common names "Washboard", "Maple Leaf", "Ebony", "Pimpleback", and "Three Ridge" are popular for use in pearl culture due to their compatibility with the host animal and the nacre they are to be covered by. These high-quality and sought-after shells are first sliced into strips and then into cubes. The edges and corners are ground down until they are roughly spherical and then milled to become perfectly round, and brought to a highly polished finish.

== Pearl nuclei: the core of modern cultured pearls ==
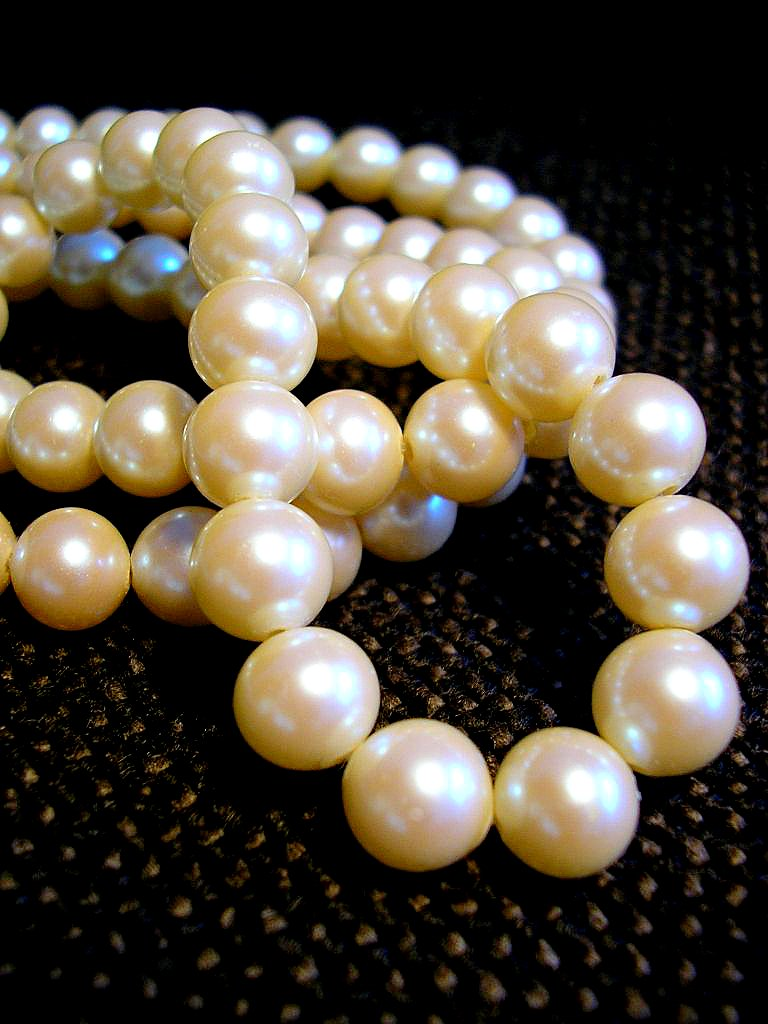
White pearl necklace

A pearl nucleus or a bead for cultured pearl is a sphere (usually) or other shape (occasionally) formed only by cutting and polishing a nacreous shell used to accommodate the nacre secreted from a graft of mantle tissue, that eventually forms the centre of a beaded cultured pearl. While the material can be of anything that does not negatively affect the health of a pearl oyster, the modern age pearl cultivators normally use freshwater bivalves that either come from the US Mississippi River or China's freshwater bodies located in Hunan and Jiangxi provinces.

=== Nucleation ===
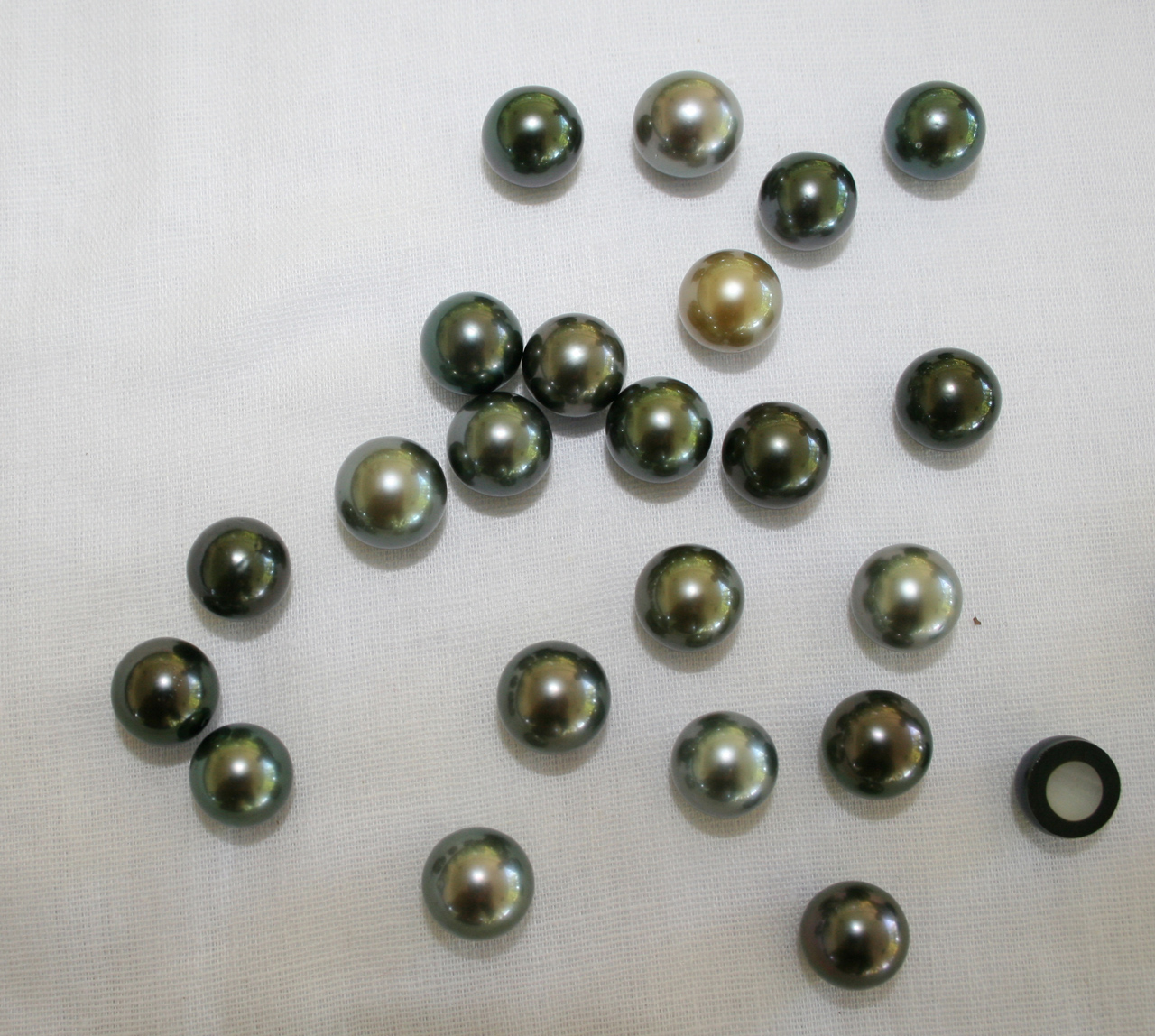
Cultured dark Tahiti pearls — one of the pearls is cut to expose the manmade nucleus bead

The cultured pearls on the market today can be divided into two categories. The first category covers the beaded cultured pearls, including Akoya, South Sea, Tahitian, and the large, modern freshwater pearl, the Edison pearl. These pearls are gonad-grown, and usually one pearl is grown at a time. This limits the number of pearls at a harvest period. The pearls are usually harvested after one year for akoya, 2–4 years for Tahitian and South Sea, and 2–7 years for Edison. This perliculture process was first developed by British biologist William Saville-Kent, who passed the information along to Tatsuhei Mise and Tokichi Nishikawa from Japan.

The second category includes the non-beaded freshwater cultured pearls, such as Biwa or Chinese pearls. As they grow in the mantle, where up to 25 grafts can be implanted on each wing, these pearls are much more common and are known to saturate the market. A significant improvement in quality has taken place in recent years, when the formerly rice grain-shaped pebbles are compared with the near round pearls of today. In the last two years, large, near perfectly round, bead-nucleated pearls up to 15 mm in diameter with metallic luster have been produced.

The nucleus bead in a beaded cultured pearl is generally a polished sphere made from freshwater mussel shell. Along with a small piece of mantle tissue from another mollusk (donor shell) to serve as a catalyst for the pearl sac, it is surgically implanted into the gonad (reproductive organ) of a saltwater mollusk. In freshwater perliculture, only the piece of tissue is used in most cases, and is inserted into the fleshy mantle of the host bivalve. South Sea and Tahitian pearl oysters, as Pinctada maxima and Pinctada margaritifera, respectively, which survive the subsequent surgery to remove the finished pearl, are often implanted with a new, larger bead as part of the same procedure, and then returned to the water for another 2–3 years of growth. An experimental process using a radio-frequency identification nucleus allows the provenance of cultured pearls to be tracked.

== History ==
=== Song Dynasty (960 to 1279 AD) ===
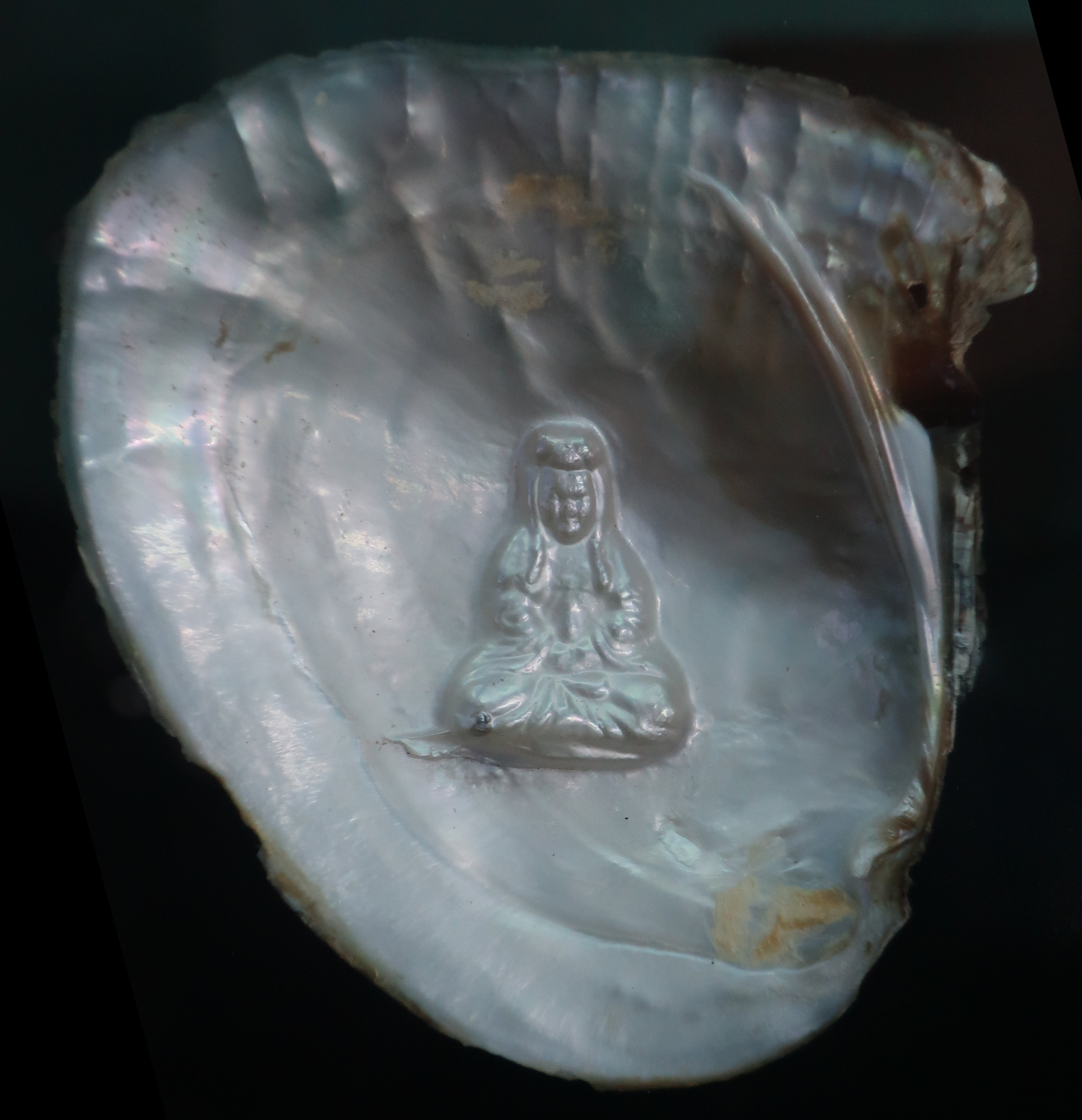
Cultured Mabe pearl in the shape of a Buddha

One of the first recorded histories of cultured pearls was found in the ancient China during the Song Dynasty. The cultivation method was the same as the Mabe-pearl (half pearl) that we know of today. Instead of using the shells or saibo as the core, they used a mold to create a buddhist figure made from lead. The mold was then inserted into the freshwater mussel shell, Hyriopsis cumingii.

=== Reaching Europe ===
In 1637, Mr. Song Yingxing compiled a Chinese encyclopedia called Tiangong Kaiwu (天工開物). Chapter 18 of this collection mentioned about the pearls and the formation theory. Along the line of history and with the help of the Silk Road, Tiangong Kaiwu arrived in Europe and was translated. Scientists who were fascinated by the mysteries of pearls began their quest to find out how pearls are formed.

=== Formation theories and cultivation research ===
From the 16th to the 18th century, the western world advanced in pearl research as new technologies, such as microscopes, developed. Scientists began more sophisticated research on pearl formation, developing new theories one after another. Disease Causation Theory (Guillaume Rondeletius, 1507 - 1566), Egg Causation Theory (Chauveton, 1578), Sand Grain Causation Theory (Sir R. Redding, 1674), Parasite Causation Theory (D. E. von Baer, 1830), and the Pearl Sac Theory (William Saville Kent, 1893) were all theories that tried to explain the pearls' formation.

=== The Rise of the modern cultured pearl industry ===
Mikimoto Kōkichi was able to use Nishikawa's technology. After the patent was granted in 1916, the technology was immediately commercially applied to akoya pearl oysters in Japan in 1916. Mise's brother was the first to produce a commercial crop of pearls in the akoya oyster. Mitsubishi's Baron Iwasaki immediately applied the technology to the South Sea pearl oyster in 1917 in the Philippines, and later in Buton and Palau. Mitsubishi was the first to produce a cultured South Sea pearl – although the first small commercial crop of pearls was not successfully produced until 1928.

The original Japanese cultured pearls, known as akoya pearls, are produced by a species of small pearl oyster, Pinctada fucata, which is no bigger than 6 to 8 cm in size, hence akoya pearls larger than 10 mm in diameter are extremely rare and highly priced. Today, a hybrid mollusk is used in both Japan and China in the production of akoya pearls. Furthermore, other Pinctada and Pteria species are also used for producing cultured pearls today.

=== Modern industry ===
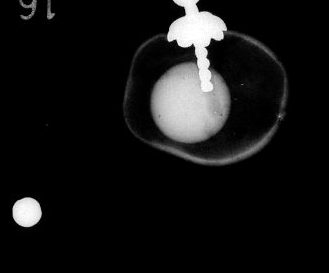
X-ray of a cultured pearl set in jewelry

The development of cultured pearls took much of the chance, risk, and guesswork out of the pearl industry, allowing it to become stable and predictable, and fostering its rapid growth over the past 100 years. Today, more than 99% of all pearls sold worldwide are cultured pearls. Colored pearls, which occur due to local chemicals inside the shell, much in the way of rubies or sapphires, can be made by inserting colored minerals into the mussel shell, e.g., cobalt chloride to create a pinkish color.

Cultured pearls can often be distinguished from natural pearls through the use of X-rays, which reveals the inner nucleus of the pearl.

== See also ==
- Cultured freshwater pearls
- Imitation pearl
