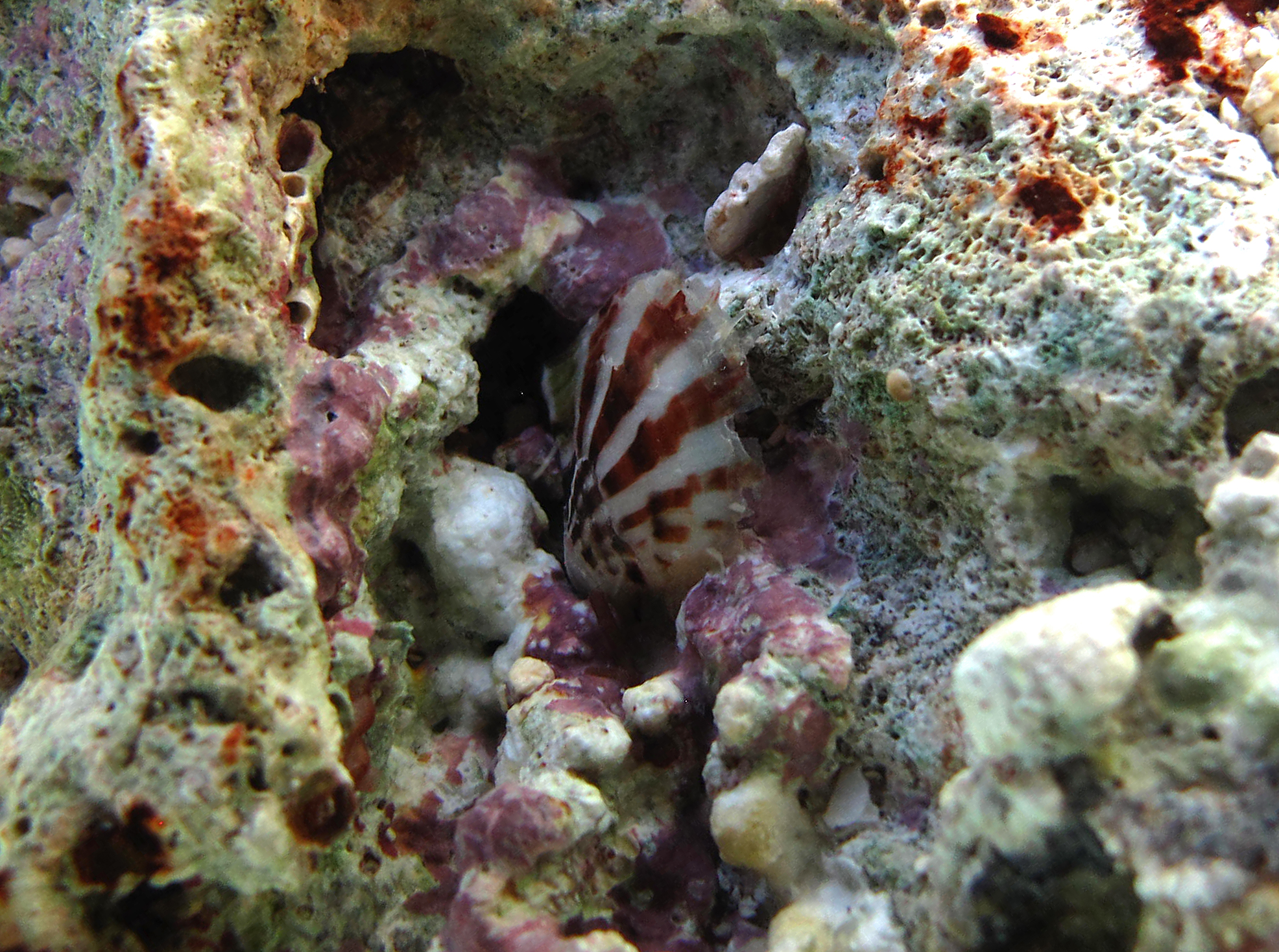

Scientific classification
- Kingdom: Animalia
- Phylum: Mollusca
- Class: Bivalvia
- Order: Pteriida
- Family: Pteriidae
- Genus: Pinctada
- Species: P. radiata

Binomial name
- Pinctada radiata (Leach, 1814)

Synonyms
- Avicula radiata Leach, 1814; Meleagrina conomenosi (Monterosato, 1884); Meleagrina savignyi (Monterosato, 1884); Avicula albina var. vaillanti (Vassel, 1897)

= Pinctada radiata =

Species of bivalve

Pinctada radiata, commonly known as the Atlantic pearl-oyster or the Gulf pearl oyster is a species of pearl oyster distributed throughout the Indo-Pacific and in the Mediterranean. Its range extends as far north as Japan and as far south as the Australian state of Victoria.

== Description ==
P. radiata is generally between 50 and 65 millimetres (2.0 and 2.6 in) in length, though it can reach 106 millimetres (4.2 in). The shell is thin, compressed, and square-like, with growth rings and ribs on the top surface. Its coloration varies, though it usually displays a brown or red exterior with a pearly interior and a light brown edge. More rarely, the shell may display a green or bronze exterior. Darker brown or red rays may mark the shell, creating darker areas at the margin. The shell's shape and structure also show much variation, hence its many synonyms; it has been described as "very similar to Pinctada margaritifera", and has been misidentified on occasion as P. margaritifera. P. radiata is hermaphroditic, with reproductive maturity being influenced by temperature.

Right and left valve of the same specimen:

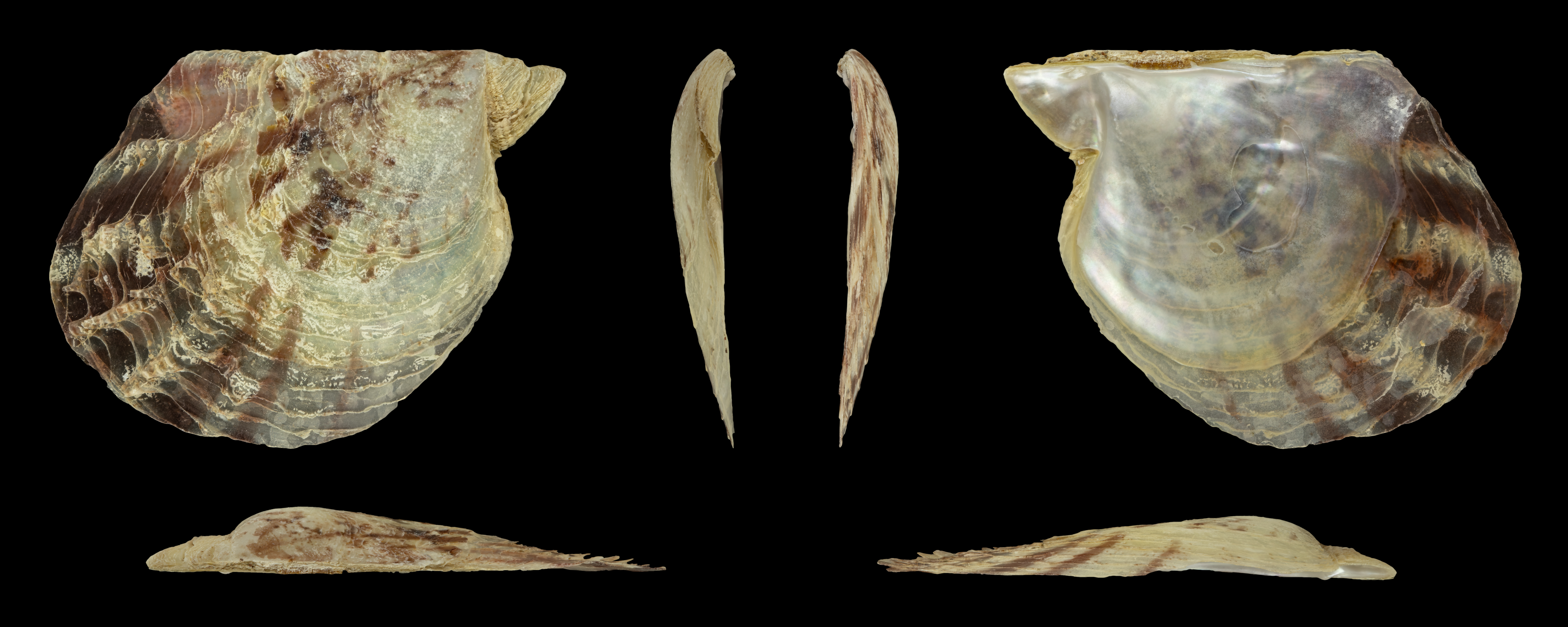
Right valve

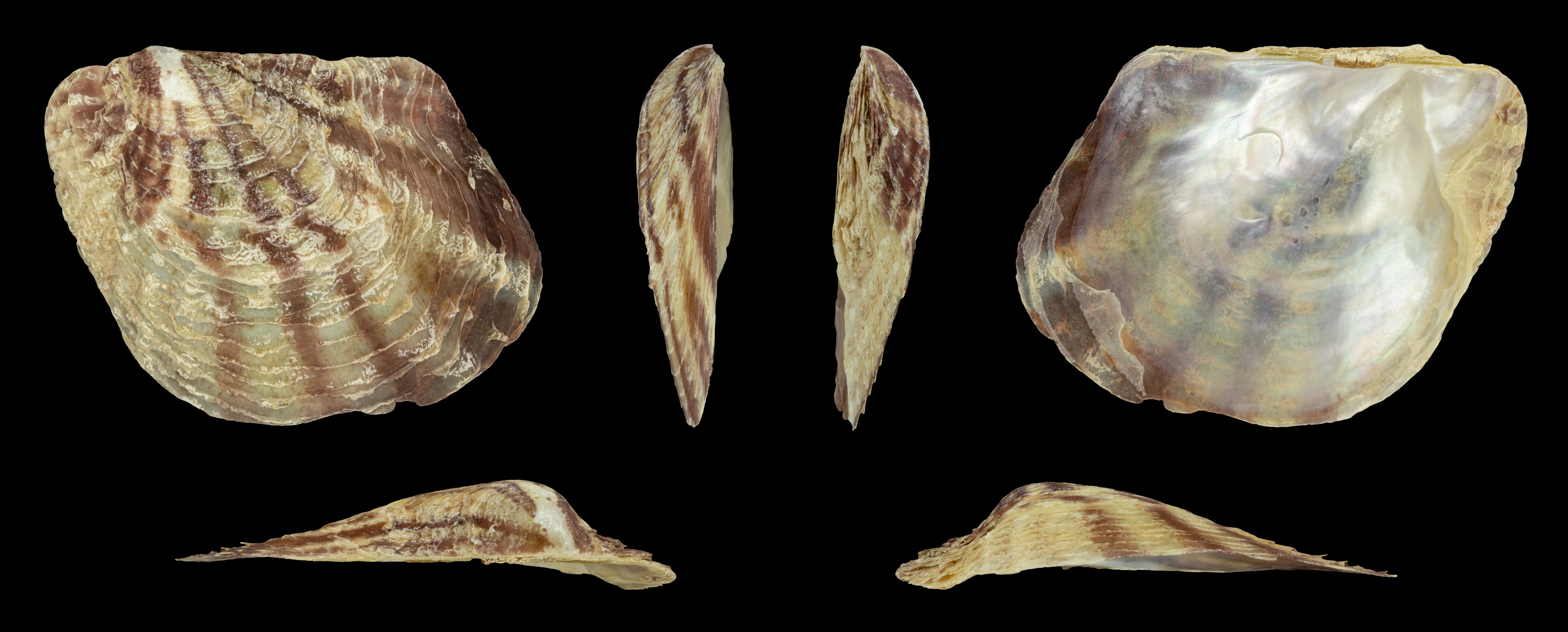
Left valve

== Distribution ==
Pinctada radiata occurs throughout the Indo-Pacific and Mediterranean Sea at all depths, though it is generally found between 5 and 25 metres (16 and 82 ft). It attaches itself to various hard substrata, including rocks and wrecks. P. radiata is common throughout its range, possibly because of its adaptation to subtropical environments and ability to survive in polluted water. It was originally distributed only in the Indo-Pacific, but has been introduced into the Mediterranean unintentionally through the Suez Canal and intentionally for aquaculture. Pinctada radiata is the first recorded Lessepsian migrant, with the earliest documented record dating back to 1874 in Alexandria, Egypt, just five years after the Suez Canal was opened.

== Human uses ==
Pinctada radiata is harvested for pearls, especially in Qatari waters, where it may constitute up to 95% of the oyster catch. It is also caught for its edible flesh and lustrous shell. P. radiata has also been investigated for possible use as a bioindicator of heavy metals in Persian Gulf waters.
