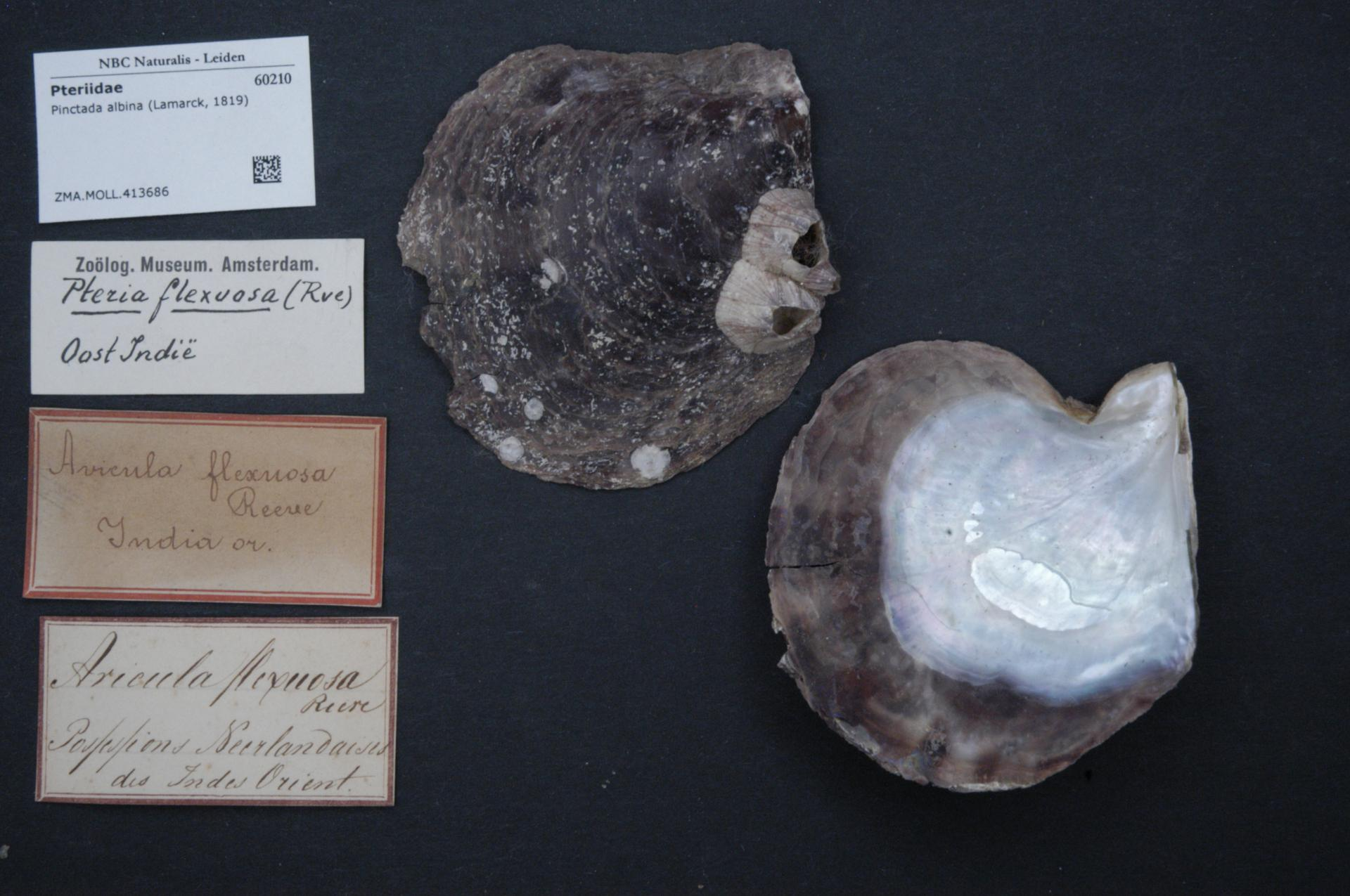

Scientific classification
- Kingdom: Animalia
- Phylum: Mollusca
- Class: Bivalvia
- Order: Pteriida
- Family: Pteriidae
- Genus: Pinctada
- Species: P. albina

Binomial name
- Pinctada albina (Lamarck, 1819)

= Pinctada albina =

Shark Bay pearl oyster

Species of bivalve

Pinctada albina is a species of pearl oyster of the genus Pinctada, known as the Shark Bay shell. Another common name is the Arafura shell, endemic to the Pacific Sea surrounded by Australia and Mexico. It is called the "Amami gai" in Japan.

== Pinctada ==
Pinctada albina belongs to the genus Pinctada. These are saltwater oysters, marine bivalve mollusks of the genus Pinctada in the family Pteriidae. They have a strong inner shell layer composed of nacre, also known as mother of pearl. Pearl oysters are not closely related to the edible oysters of family Ostreidae, and they are also not closely related to the freshwater pearl mussels of the families Unionidae and Margaritiferidae. Like other members of the genus Pinctada, they share the physiological properties that can lead to the production of large pearls of commercial value, and therefore attempts have been made to harvest pearls commercially from many different Pinctada species.

== Characteristics ==
The species is small, only three to four inches in diameter. The shells are either grayish or greenish yellow and surrounded by a few indistinct brownish-green radial bands. Nacre is tinted yellowish-green, with a slight border of pale yellow, and has brown markings. The shell has a rounded outline, with a nearly equal height and width. Oyster shells are usually oval or pear-shaped, but will vary widely in form depending on what they attach to. Oysters have a strong inner shell layer composed of nacre, also known as "mother of pearl". An oyster can filter 1.3 gallons of water per hour.

== Habitat and distribution ==
Although the population stretches along the northern coast up the Great Barrier Reef, P. albina is predominantly found in Shark Bay, Western Australia. P. albina thrives in relatively shallow waters, which contributed to its being the first Australian pearl oyster discovered. When European adventurers first recruited Aboriginals to collect pearl oysters, they found P. albina, as it was accessible from wading or swimming offshore.

The distribution of P. albina reaches Northern Australia, from Papua New Guinea through the Philippines and up to Micronesia. The widespread distribution is equal to P. maxima. They can also be found in the United States, Brazil, and Canada.

== Commercially ==
Pearls are only occasionally found. They are yellow and small. The nacre is thin and the shells are small, making them of little commercial value. However, before the introduction of the Mississippi shell, their ideal shape for buttons made “Shark Bay” shells critical to the Mother of Pearl Industry in the 19th century. Today, the species is used for culturing blister pearls (Mabe pearls).

== Sources ==
- "Marine Life of the Dampier Archipelago". The Western Australian Museum. 2006.
- http://shell.kwansei.ac.jp/~shell/pic_book/data37/r003666.html
