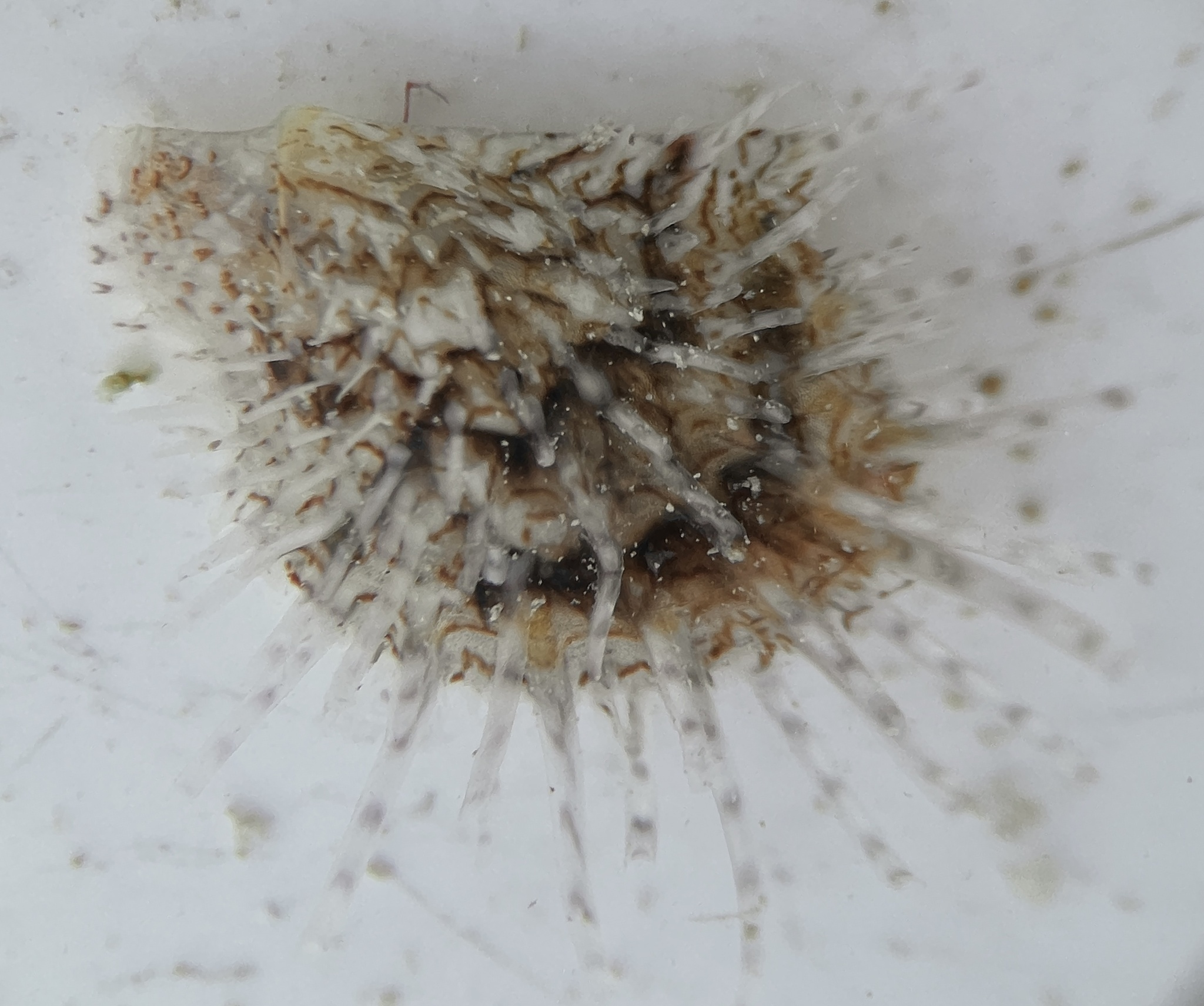

Scientific classification
- Kingdom: Animalia
- Phylum: Mollusca
- Class: Bivalvia
- Order: Pteriida
- Family: Pteriidae
- Genus: Pinctada
- Species: P. longisquamosa

Binomial name
- Pinctada longisquamosa (Dunker, 1852)

= Pinctada longisquamosa =

Species of bivalve

Pinctada longisquamosa, sometimes called scaly pearl oysters, are a small species of pearl oyster found in the western Atlantic. They are distinguished by unique prismatic shell structures which protrude from the outer shell.

== Taxonomy ==
Pinctada longisquamosa are invertebrate bivalves of the phylum Mollusca, which include cephalopods such as squids and gastropods such as snails and slugs. Pearl oysters such as Pinctada longisquamosa are not true oysters (order Ostreida), but rather members of a separate order, Pteriida, that includes pearl oysters and winged oysters. The fossil record of their family, Pteriidae, extends from the Triassic Period.

The species was originally described as being from the Eastern Pacific Ocean, but this appears to have been due to an error in the locality data. Partly because of this confusion the species was often frequently confounded with Pinctada imbricata and Pteria colymbus. the Western Atlantic's main Pteriidae representatives. Recent efforts to classify Western Atlantic bivalves have confirmed Pinctada longisquamosa as a distinct species and supported its transfer from the genus Pteria to the genus Pinctada.

== Description ==
Pinctada longisquamosa is a relatively small pearl oyster, with a mean length of 23 mm and a height of 20 mm. The largest recorded specimen, housed at the American Museum of Natural History, has a length of 39 mm and a height of 29 mm. Pinctada longisquamosa is noted for its radial rows of narrow shell lamellae and generally bright green to yellow coloration. The coloration of individual specimens has been recognized as matching that of the marine plants to which they are attached, suggesting a method of camouflage. The nacre, or mother-of-pearl, is thin, “allowing external color and ornamentation to show through the valve”. Additionally, the byssal ridge, a thickening on the interior surface of the left valve, is notably prominent in Pinctada longisquamosa.

Juveniles display opaque white irregular blotches, which are randomly distributed. The conspicuous lamellae that are characteristic of adult Pinctada longisquamosa are largely absent.

== Behavior ==
Preliminary quantitative and qualitative data indicate that Pinctada longisquamosa exhibit fluctuating population densities, from absence to 300 individuals/m^{2}. It is unclear whether these fluctuations are seasonal or in response to “the extremes of high and low salinity that sometimes occur in the Florida Bay estuarine system”.

It has also been suggested that Pinctada longiquamosa exhibit a behavior described as “suicide spawning,” in which older pearl oysters go through a period of spawning then die off in response to a strong storm, such as a hurricane. The functionality of this behavior is the subject of further research.

== Distribution and habitat ==
Populations of Pinctada longisquamosa are found in the Gulf of Mexico and Caribbean Sea, from St. Augustine, Florida to Texas, Bermuda, The Bahamas, the Greater and Lesser Antilles, and the Caribbean coast of Mexico, Colombia, and Venezuela.

In Florida Bay, where the pearl oyster is most thoroughly documented, its preferred habitat is shallow seagrass, particularly Thalassia testudinum, often intermixed with seaweed. Less frequently, Pinctada longisquamosa has been recorded in mixed algae on mangrove roots and rocks, in Halimeda (a genus of green macroalgae) clumps, associated with sponges and gorgonian stalks, and attached to floating Sargassum (a large, brown seaweed). It is sometimes found on the ocean side of the afore-mentioned islands, but only in near-shore shallows, and is considered more typical of shallow Florida Bay. The deepest record for living specimens of Pinctada longisquamosa is 4 m, supporting its characterization as a shallow water bivalve.

== Diet ==
Like other pearl oysters, Pinctada longisquamosa are filter-feeders, using their gills to capture phytoplankton and other particulate food and expelling the excess seawater. This exposes them to vulnerability to water pollution and scarcity of resources in the case of storms, flooding, and other disruptive events.
