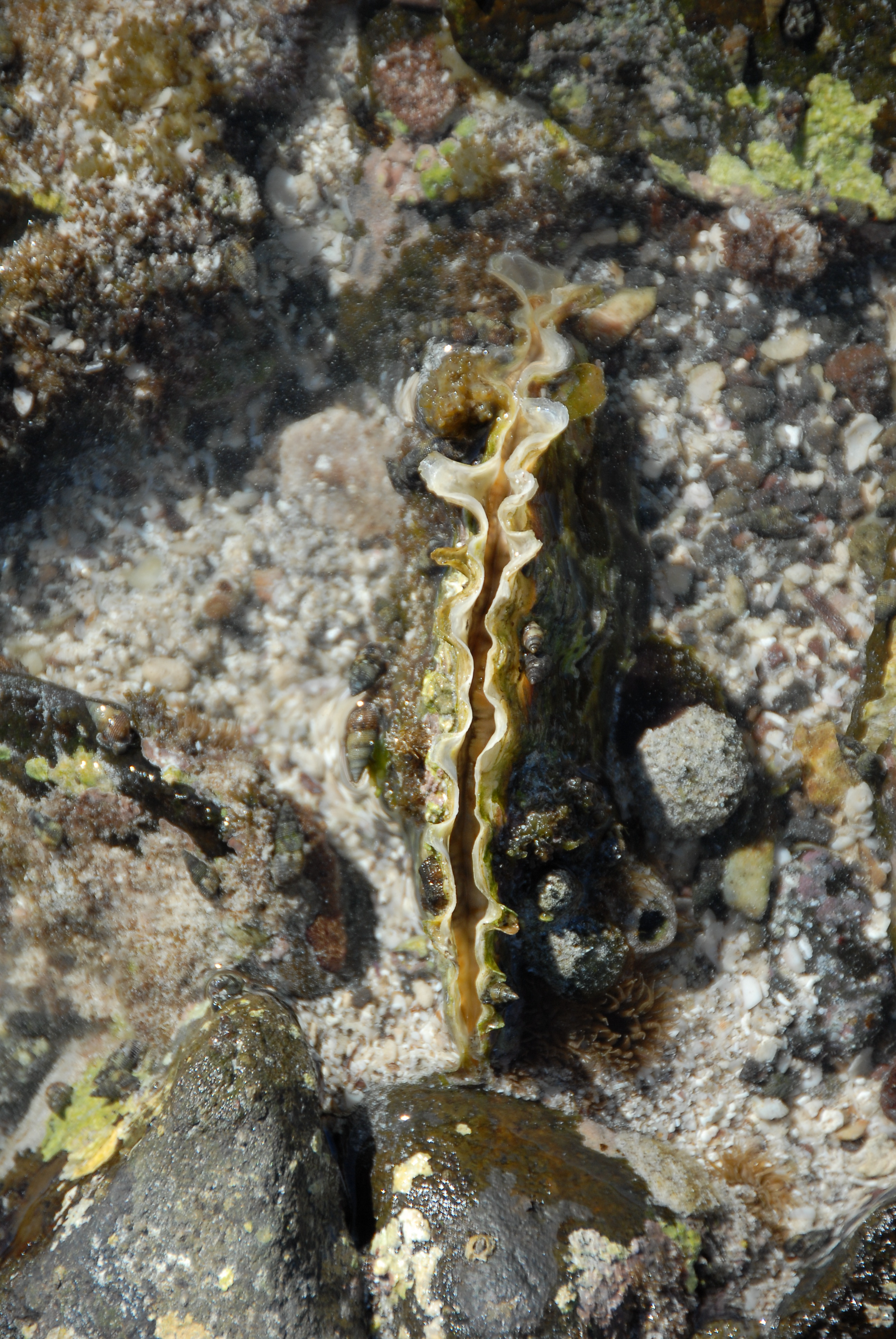
- Pinctada mazatlanica in life, photographed in the Gulf of California

Scientific classification
- Kingdom: Animalia
- Phylum: Mollusca
- Class: Bivalvia
- Order: Pteriida
- Family: Pteriidae
- Genus: Pinctada
- Species: P. mazatlanica

Binomial name
- Pinctada mazatlanica (Hanley, 1856)

Synonyms
- Meleagrina mazatlanica Hanley, 1856; Avicula barbata Reeve, 1857

= Pinctada mazatlanica =

Species of bivalve

Pinctada mazatlanica is a species of tropical marine bivalve mollusc in the family Pteriidae, the pearl oysters. It is known by the English common names pearl oyster, Mazatlan pearl oyster, and Panama pearl oyster. Spanish common names include madre perla, and ostra perlifera panameña. This mollusc was first described to science in 1856 by conchologist Sylvannus Charles Thorp Hanley. Pinctada mazatlanica produces gem-quality pearls and was the basis of a pearling industry in the Gulf of California for centuries.

== Description ==
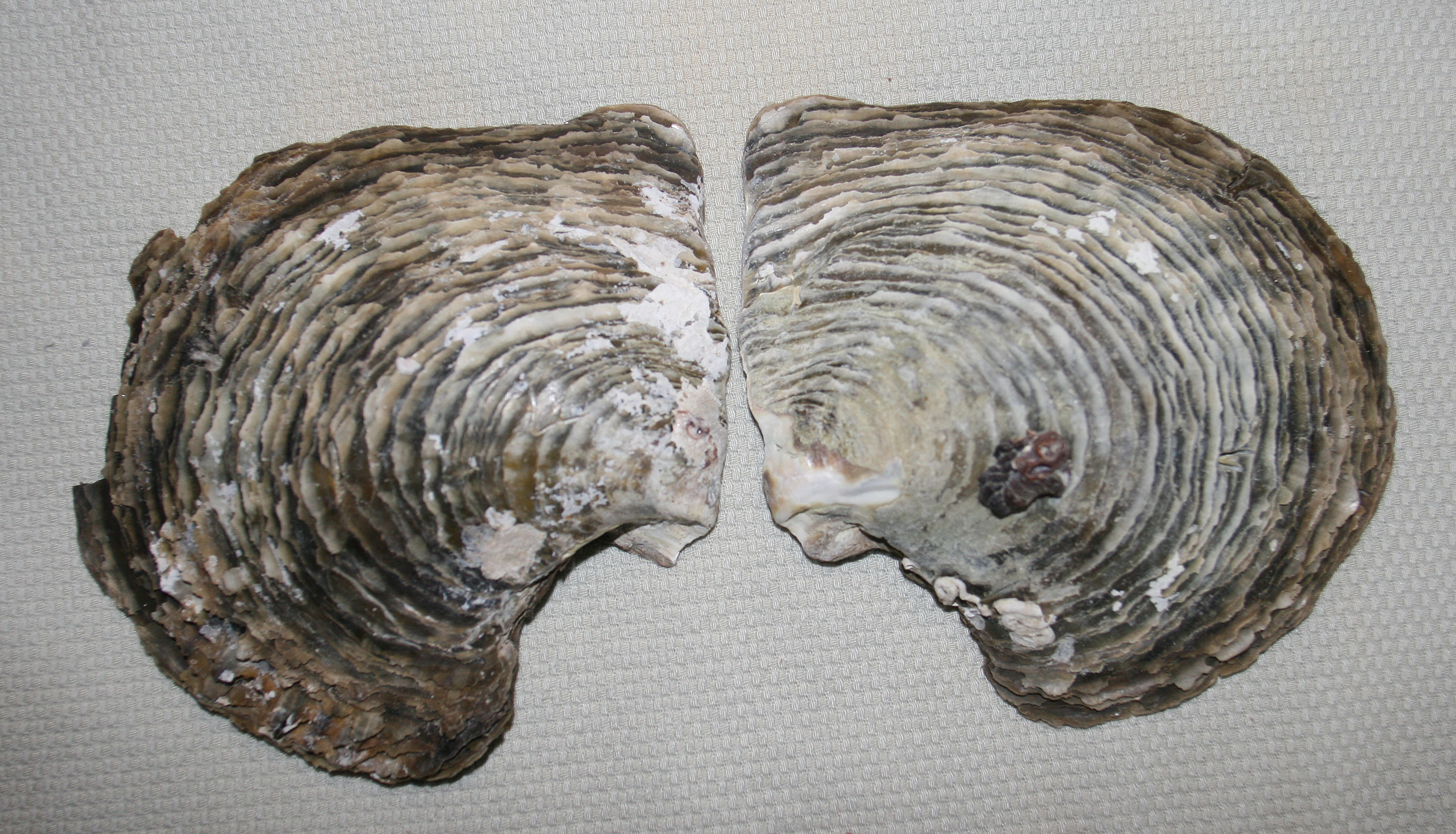
Exterior of the shells

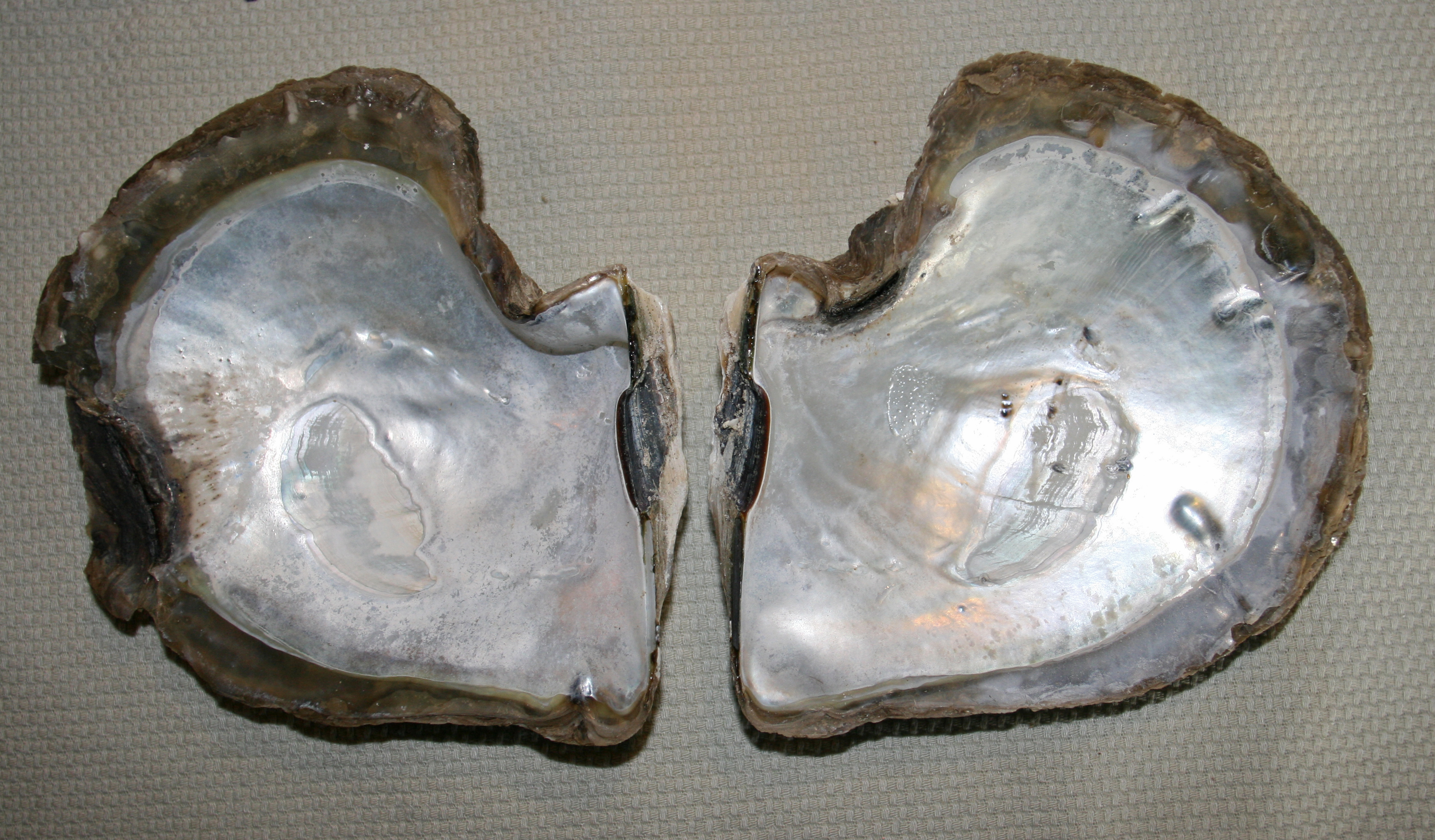
Interior of the shells

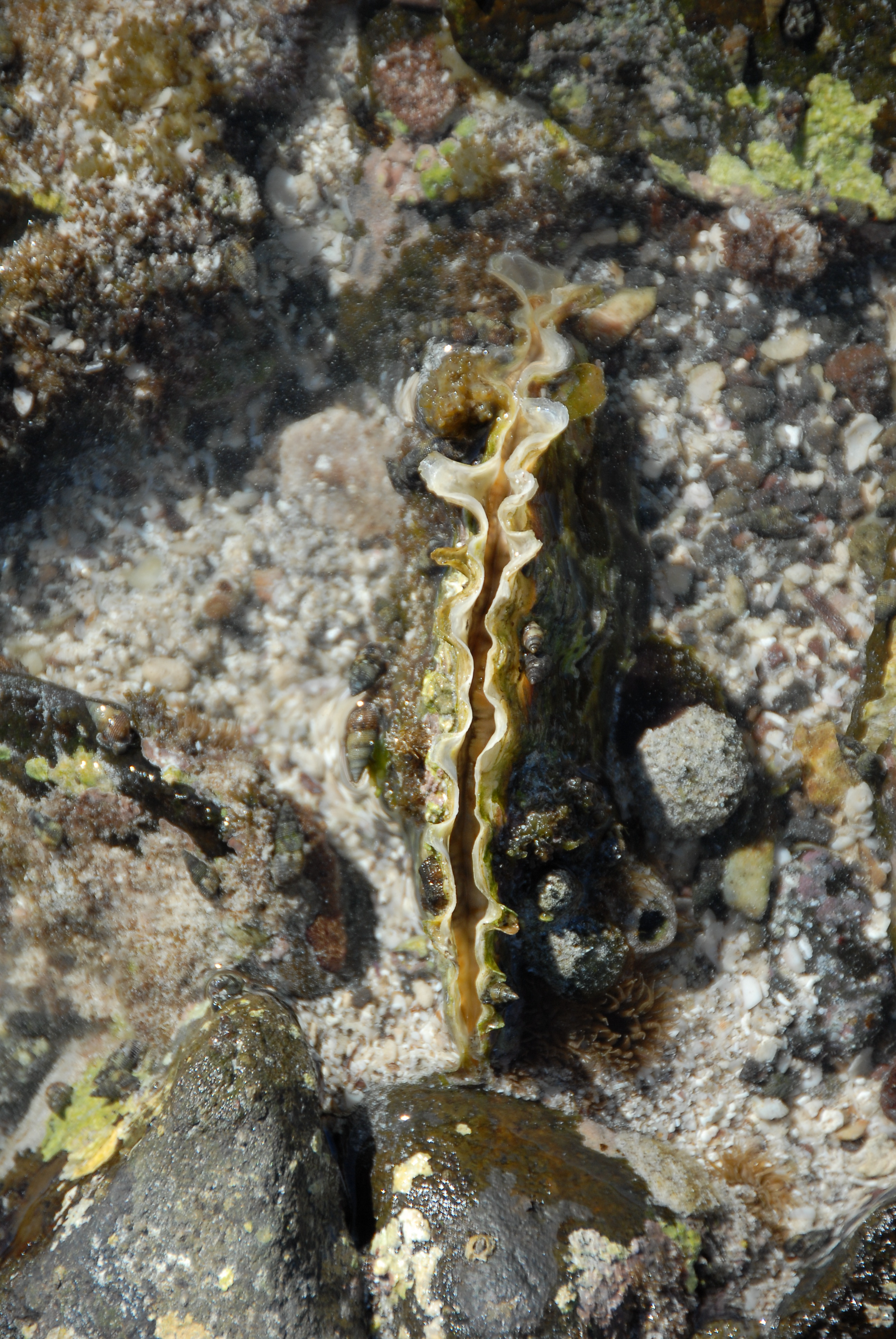

Valves are shallow, attaining a maximum length of 20 cm (7.9 in). They are generally round with minimal, if any, wing-like extensions on the hinge margin which are found in other species of its family. In life, the shell has a shaggy periostracum, or skin-like coating. The exterior of the valves is grayish-brown and scaly. The interior is brilliantly nacreous, iridescent mother-of-pearl.

== Distribution ==
Pinctada mazatlanica is found in the eastern Pacific Ocean from Baja California Sur to Peru, including the Gulf of California. It is also widespread in the Galapagos Islands. These pearl oysters live in shallow water from 3 to 30 meters (9.8 to 98.4 ft) deep on coral reefs and rocky bottoms.

== Life history ==
Pearl oysters begin life as males. When they reach approximately 100 mm (3.9 in), they transform into females, a process known as protandrous hermaphroditism. They reproduce by broadcast spawning, releasing sperm and eggs into the sea to achieve fertilization. In the Gulf of California, spawning takes place in September.

The fertilized egg develops into a free-swimming veliger which feeds on smaller plankton. At roughly three weeks after fertilization, the veliger becomes a pediveliger. At this stage of development, the animal is approximately 0.2 mm in diameter and has a foot which allows it to crawl on the seabed. In response to some unknown environmental cue, the pediveliger attaches itself to the seabed with a byssus and grows into adulthood at that spot.

Pearls form naturally in approximately 5% of the pearl oysters of this species.

A male and female pair of the shrimp Pontonia pinnae is often found dwelling inside the live shells.

== History ==
This oyster along with the Pacific wing-oyster (Pteria sterna) was the subject of a pearl fishery in the Gulf of California since before the arrival of Hernando Cortez in 1535. The Spaniards quickly appreciated the value of the harvest and in 1586 declared the gathering of oysters to be a right of the Spanish crown. By the 1840s, the export of the shells was as valuable as the pearls extracted from them; the nacreous shells were used to make mother-of-pearl buttons for clothing. In 1874, compressed air diving equipment made harvesting the oysters easier. By the early 1900s, some 200,000 to 500,000 oysters were being harvested annually. This over-exploitation caused populations of both species of oyster to become depleted and in 1940 the fishery was closed by the Mexican Government, a ban that (as of 2026) still remains in force.

The Gulf of California pearl industry was the basis of John Steinbeck's novella, The Pearl, published in 1947.
