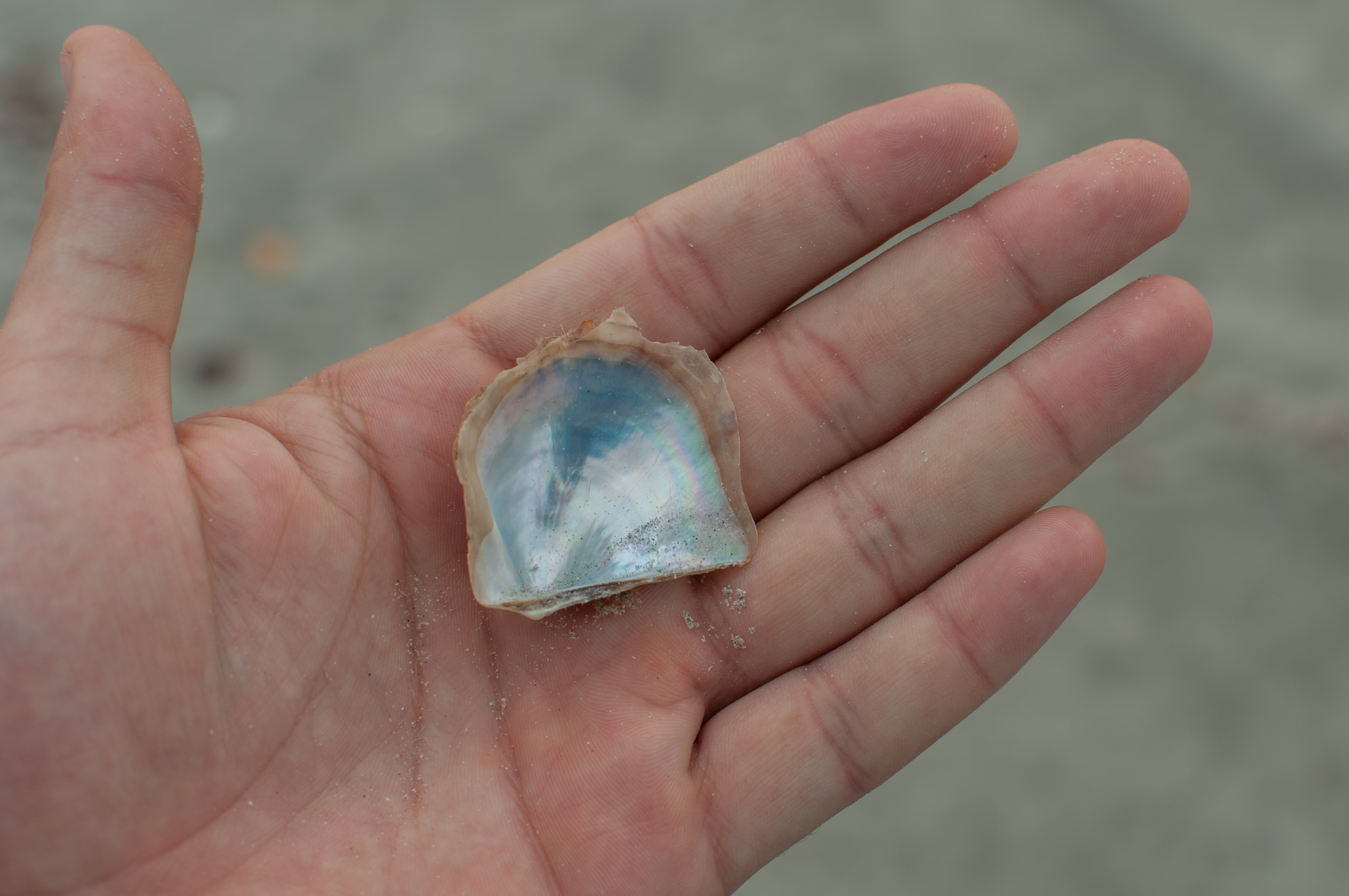

Scientific classification
- Kingdom: Animalia
- Phylum: Mollusca
- Class: Bivalvia
- Order: Pteriida
- Family: Pteriidae
- Genus: Pinctada
- Species: P. imbricata

Binomial name
- Pinctada imbricata Röding, 1798

= Pinctada imbricata =

Species of bivalve

Pinctada imbricata is a species of bivalve belonging to the family Pteriidae.

The species has almost cosmopolitan distribution.
