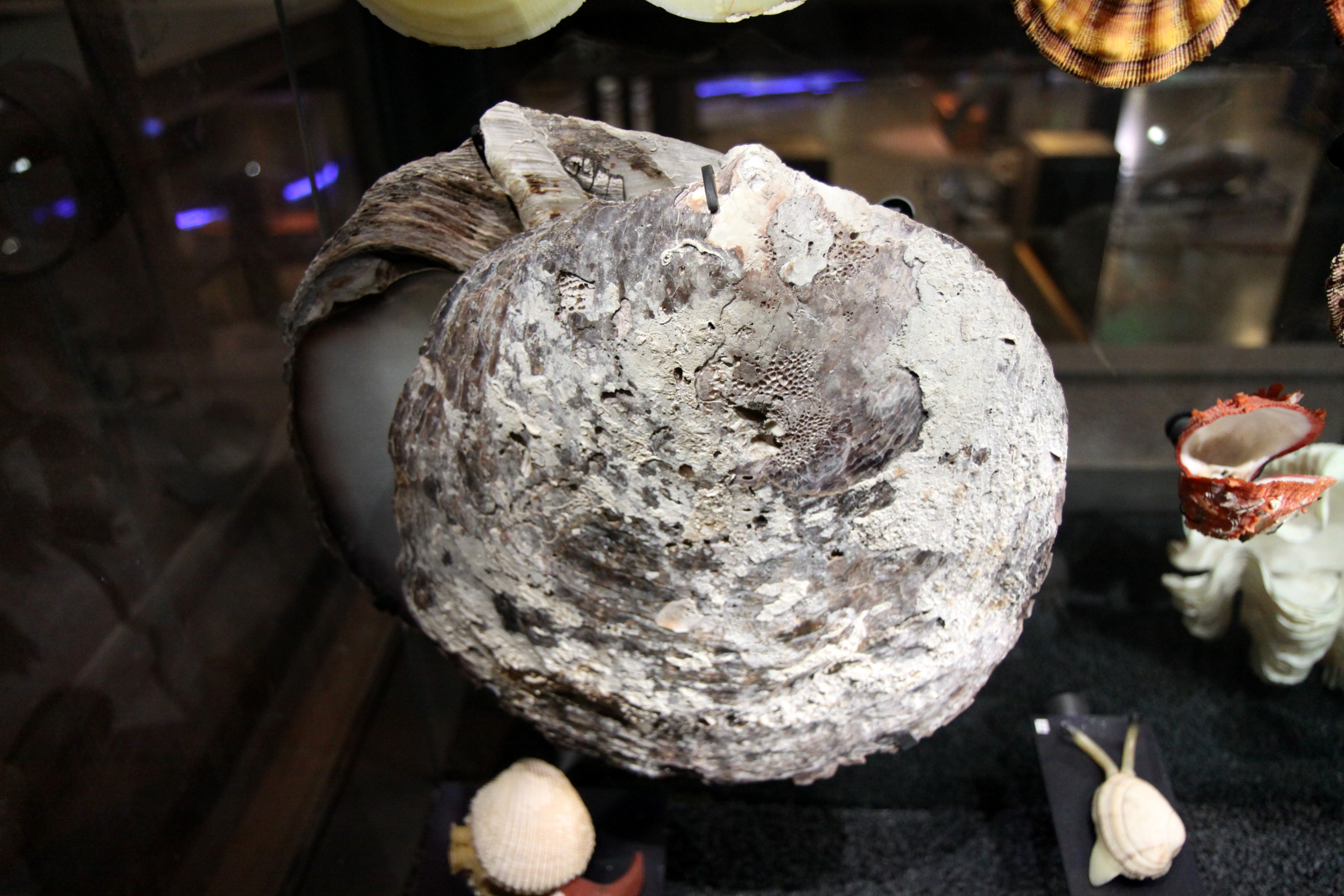

Scientific classification
- Kingdom: Animalia
- Phylum: Mollusca
- Class: Bivalvia
- Order: Pteriida
- Family: Pteriidae
- Genus: Pinctada
- Species: P. maxima

Binomial name
- Pinctada maxima (Jameson, 1901)

= Pinctada maxima =

Species of bivalve

Pinctada maxima is a species of pearl oyster, a marine bivalve mollusk in the family Pteriidae, the pearl oysters. There are two different color varieties: the Gold-lipped oyster and the Silver-lipped oyster. These bivalves are the largest pearl oysters in the world. They have a very strong inner shell layer composed of nacre, also known as "mother of pearl" and are important to the cultured pearl industry as they are cultivated to produce South Sea pearls.

The South Sea pearl or Philippine pearl was declared by Philippine President Fidel Ramos as the national gem in 1996 through Proclamation No. 905. The oyster and pearl are depicted on the reverse side of the Philippine New Generation Currency Series 1,000-peso bill.

== Description ==
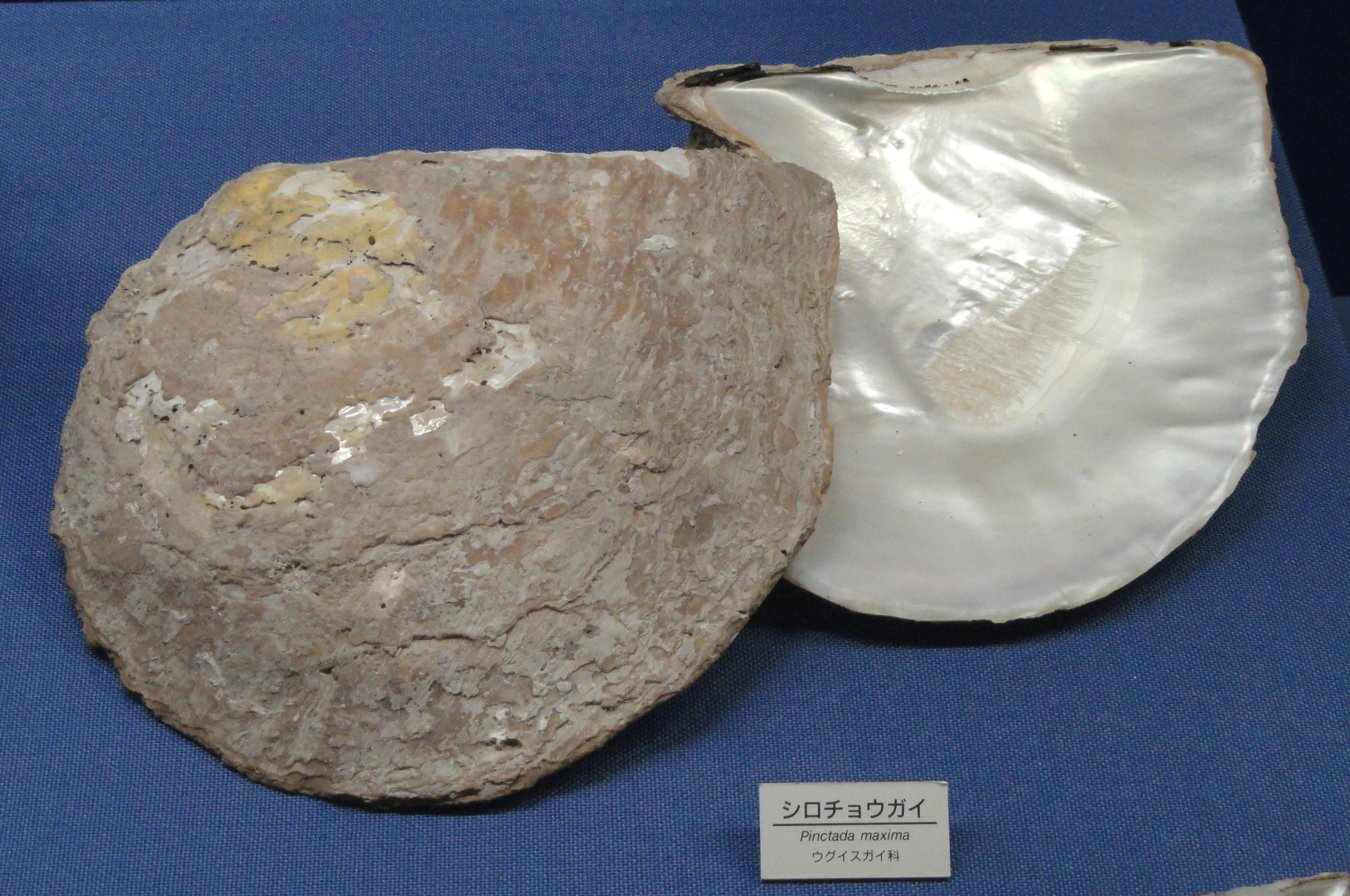
Internal and external appearance of shell

Pinctada maxima oysters grow very large, up to 12 in (30 cm) in diameter.

The two color varieties have different coloration in the outer edge of the interior. This mother of pearl or nacre is responsible for the color of the pearls that the oyster can produce. Water temperature, plankton and sediments determine which color variety is more common in a given area.

== Pearl farming (Perliculture) ==
Pinctada maxima produces South Sea pearls in colors ranging from white, silver, champagne, gold. Pinctada margaritifera produces South Sea pearls commonly referred to as Tahitian pearls or black pearls which in fact come in color hues including gray, platinum, charcoal, aubergine, and peacock. Currently south sea pearls are cultured primarily in Australia, Japan, Mexico, Tahiti and now, the Philippines. Because these pearl oysters are so large, a much larger nucleus than usual can be used in culturing. Sea pearls farmed in the Philippines, typically produce golden pearls from the gold-lipped pearl oyster, which are currently experiencing a surge in popularity, resulting in increased market-demand, particularly in Japan and Mexico.

Commercial pearl farming in Australia is mostly centered around the coastal waters of Australia, located in the Kimberley region of Western Australia. Best known and valued for their white/silver with pink hues from the silver-lipped pearl oyster, Australian South Sea Pearls can grow beyond 18mm – 20mm in diameter, with a typical size of 10mm – 13mm when harvested following a two-year gestation.

The Tahitian or black pearl comes from the black-lipped pearl oyster, produced from the waters surrounding Tahiti, Japan and Mexico and the French Polynesian archipelago.

== Culinary use ==
Pearl meat is the adductor muscle of the Pinctada maxima pearl oyster. Wild caught Australian pearl meat is MSC certified, recognizing this as a sustainable seafood which can be traced to an environmentally sustainable source. In recent years, Australian pearl meat has been adopted by some of the world's leading western chefs as an exclusive, rare ingredient, with a mere six tons sourced annually. A translucent, scallop-sized medallion, pearl meat is sweet and firm. Described as a cross between calamari and lobster in taste, the flavor profile varies significantly depending on preparation. Pearl meat is a source of Omega 3, it is high in protein and contains no trans-fats, and it also contains vitamin A and vitamin E, as well as calcium, iron, zinc, and iodine.
