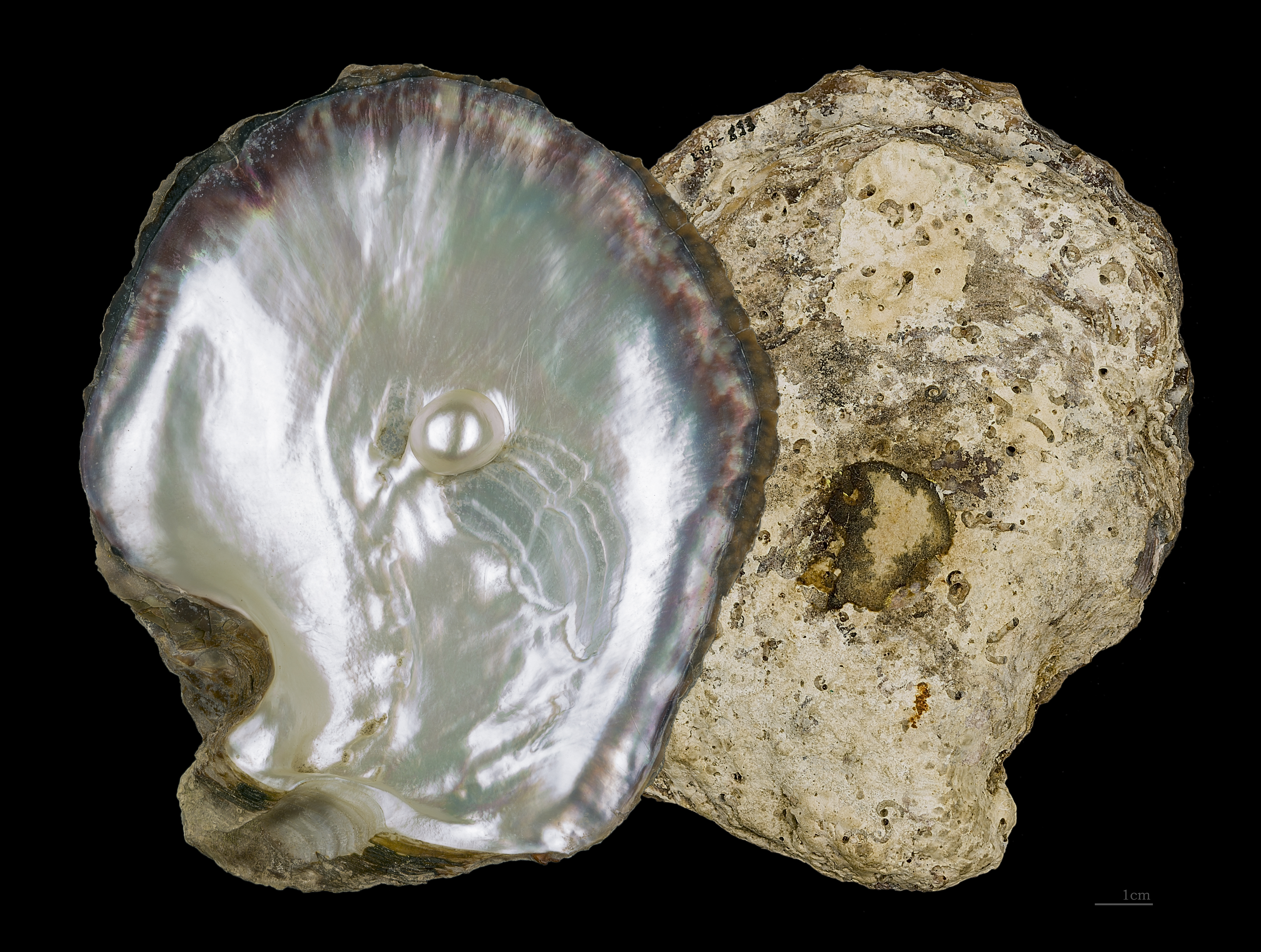
- Shell of Pinctada margaritifera

Scientific classification
- Kingdom: Animalia
- Phylum: Mollusca
- Class: Bivalvia
- Order: Pteriida
- Family: Pteriidae
- Genus: Pinctada; Röding, 1798

Species
- See text

= Pinctada =

Genus of bivalves

Pinctada is a genus of saltwater oysters, marine bivalve mollusks in the family Pteriidae. These pearl oysters have a strong inner shell layer composed of nacre, also known as "mother of pearl".

Pearl oysters are not closely related to either the edible oysters of family Ostreidae or the freshwater pearl mussels of the families Unionidae and Margaritiferidae.

Pinctada margaritifera and P. maxima are used for culturing South Sea and Tahitian pearls. They are cultured widely primarily in the central and eastern Indo-Pacific. A pearl oyster can be seen on the reverse side of the 1,000-peso note of the Philippines.

== Species of commercial value ==
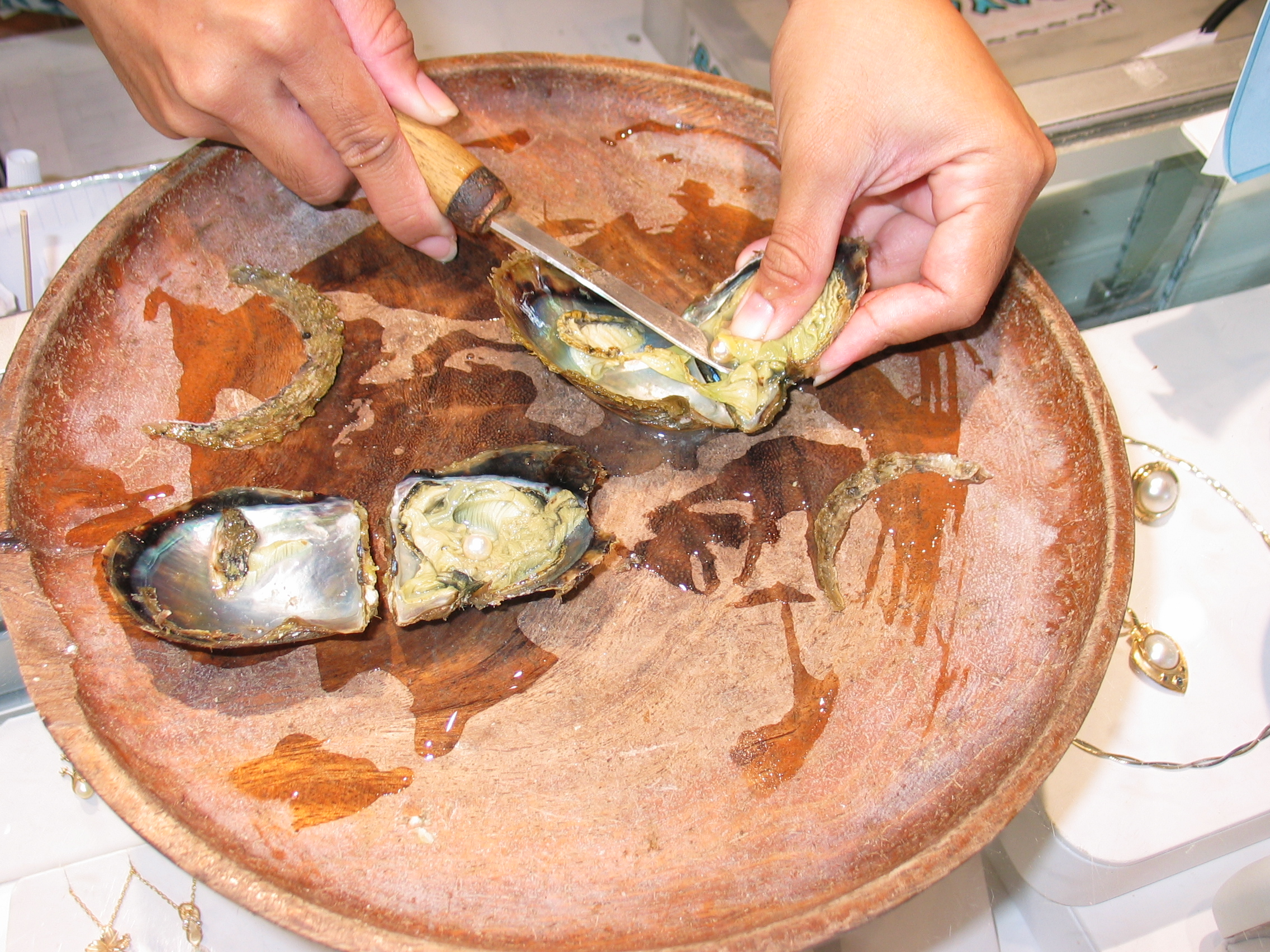
Opening and extracting pearls from farmed pearl oysters

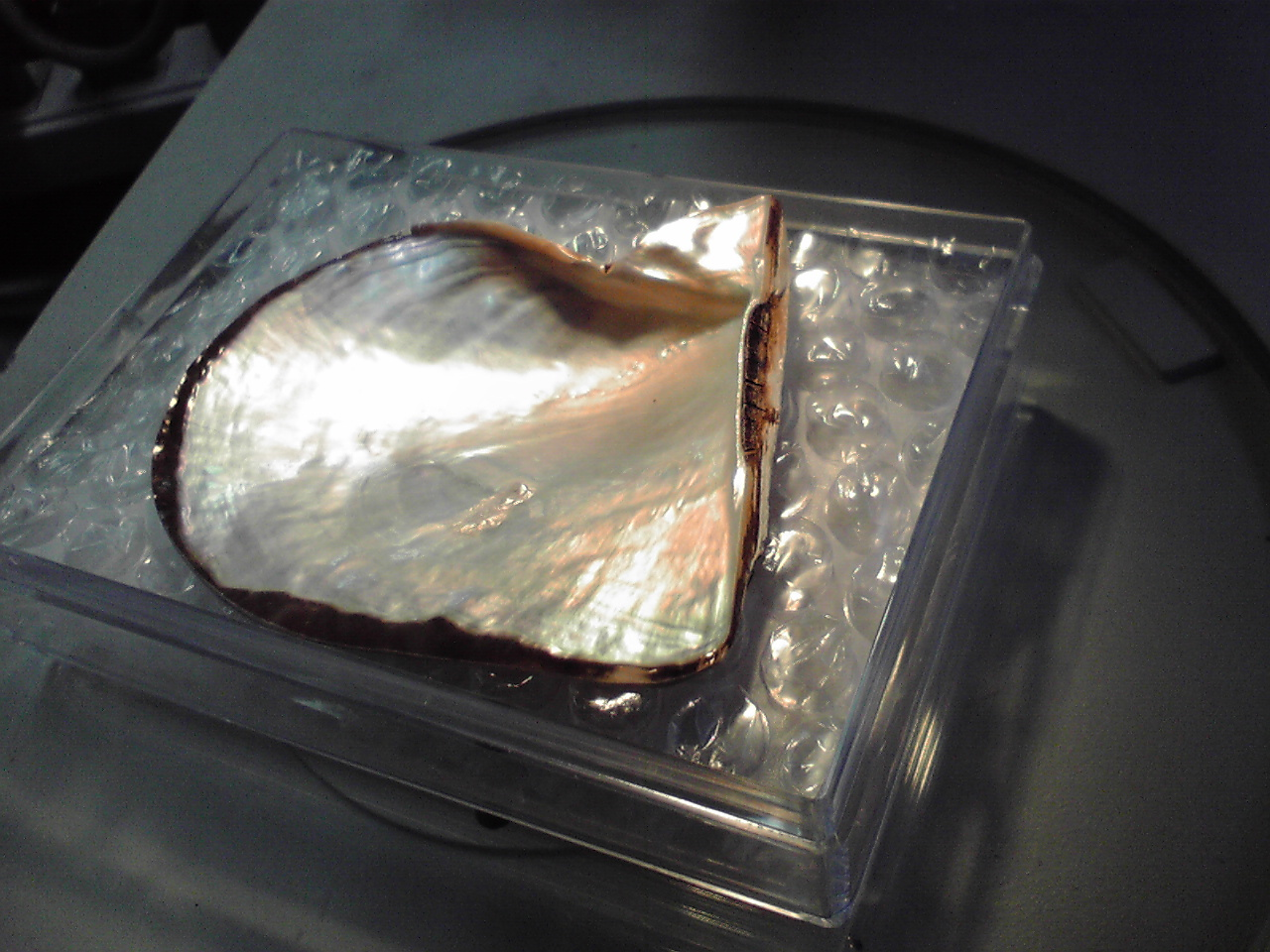
Cultivated pearl oyster (from Japan Shima, Mie)

All species within the genus produce pearls. Attempts have been made to harvest pearls commercially from many Pinctada species. However, the only species that are currently of significant commercial interest are:

- Gulf pearl oyster, Pinctada radiata; Persian Gulf, Red Sea, Mediterranean Sea and throughout the Indo-Pacific as far as Japan and Australia.
- Black-lip oyster, Pinctada margaritifera; Persian Gulf and southwestern part of Indian Ocean; Fiji; Tahiti; Myanmar; Baja California; Gulf of Mexico
- Gold-lip oyster, Pinctada maxima; Japan; Australia; Fiji; Tahiti;
- White-lip oyster, Pinctada maxima; Japan; Mexico; Australia, Cygnet Bay Pearl Farm; Fiji; Tahiti; Myanmar;
- Pinctada mazatlanica; Japan; Mexico; Panama;
- Akoya pearl oyster, Pinctada fucata (also called P. martensii), Red Sea; Persian Gulf; Indian Ocean; Western Pacific Ocean; Japan; Mexico; Australia; United States; Brazil; Canada
- Shark Bay pearl oyster Pinctada albina; Mexico; Australia

The various species of Pinctada produce different maximum sizes and colors of pearls, depending on the size of the species and the natural color of the nacre inside the shell. Black South Sea pearls, or Tahitian pearls come from the black-lip oyster; gold and silver South Sea pearls from the gold-lip and silver-lip oysters; and Akoya cultured pearls from Pinctada fucata martensii, the Akoya pearl oyster.

Pearls are also obtained in commercial quantities from some species of the closely related winged oyster genus Pteria.

Pearls are also produced from freshwater mussel species unrelated to pearl oysters. These freshwater species include Hyriopsis cumingii, Hyriopsis schlegelii, and a hybrid of the two species.

At danger from the large demand for pearls, the typical lifespan of a pearl oyster is usually around 3 years to 14 years. Pinctada maxima are seeded at about 2 years of age and take 2 years to fully develop a pearl. They can be reseeded up to 3 or 4 times. Akoya pearls are harvested after about 9 to 16 months.

Research carried out by biologist Aldemaro Romero Jr. allowed him to discover that the first animal population depleted by Europeans in the American continent was a pearl oyster species (Pinctada imbricata) off the coast of Venezuela. He analyzed historical records and used information about the biology of these and other species to explain its rapid disappearance.

== Species list ==
The World Register of Marine Species includes the following species in the genus:

- Pinctada albina (Lamarck, 1819) – Shark Bay pearl oyster
- Pinctada capensis (Sowerby III, 1890)
- Pinctada chemnitzii (Philippi, 1849)
- Pinctada cumingii (Reeve, 1857)
- Pinctada fucata (Gould, 1850) – Akoya pearl oyster – now accepted as Pinctada fucata martensii
- Pinctada galtsoffi Bartsch, 1931
- Pinctada imbricata Röding, 1798 – Gulf pearl oyster
- Pinctada inflata (Schumacher, 1817)
- Pinctada longisquamosa (Dunker, 1852)
- Pinctada maculata (Gould, 1850) – pipi pearl oyster
- Pinctada margaritifera (Linnaeus, 1758) – Black-lipped oyster
- Pinctada maxima (Jameson, 1901) – gold-lipped oyster or silver-lipped oyster
- Pinctada mazatlanica (Hanley, 1856)
- Pinctada nigra (Gould, 1850)
- Pinctada petersii (Dunker, 1852)
- Pinctada radiata (Leach, 1814) – Atlantic pearl-oyster – now accepted as Pinctada radiata
- Pinctada reeveana (Dunker, 1872)
- Pinctada sugillata (Reeve, 1857)
- Pinctada vidua (Gould, 1850)
