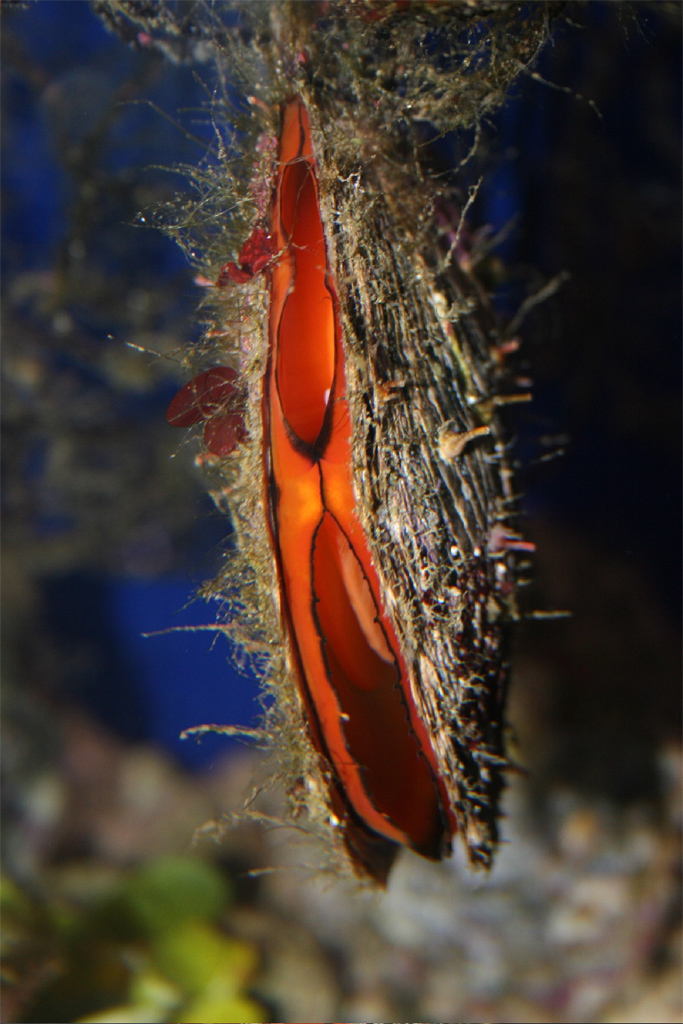
- Live individual on display in the Aquarium Finisterrae

Scientific classification
- Kingdom: Animalia
- Phylum: Mollusca
- Class: Bivalvia
- Order: Pteriida
- Family: Pteriidae
- Genus: Pinctada
- Species: P. margaritifera

Binomial name
- Pinctada margaritifera (Linnaeus, 1758)

= Pinctada margaritifera =

Black-lip pearl oyster

Species of bivalve

Pinctada margaritifera, commonly known as the black-lip pearl oyster, is a species of pearl oyster, a saltwater mollusk, a marine bivalve mollusk in the family Pteriidae. This species is common in the Indo-Pacific within tropical coral reefs.

The ability of P. margaritifera to produce pearls means that the species is a valuable resource to humans. The oysters are harvested wild from coral reefs and are also commonly grown in aquaculture, both primarily taking place in the Indo-Pacific region.

== Description ==
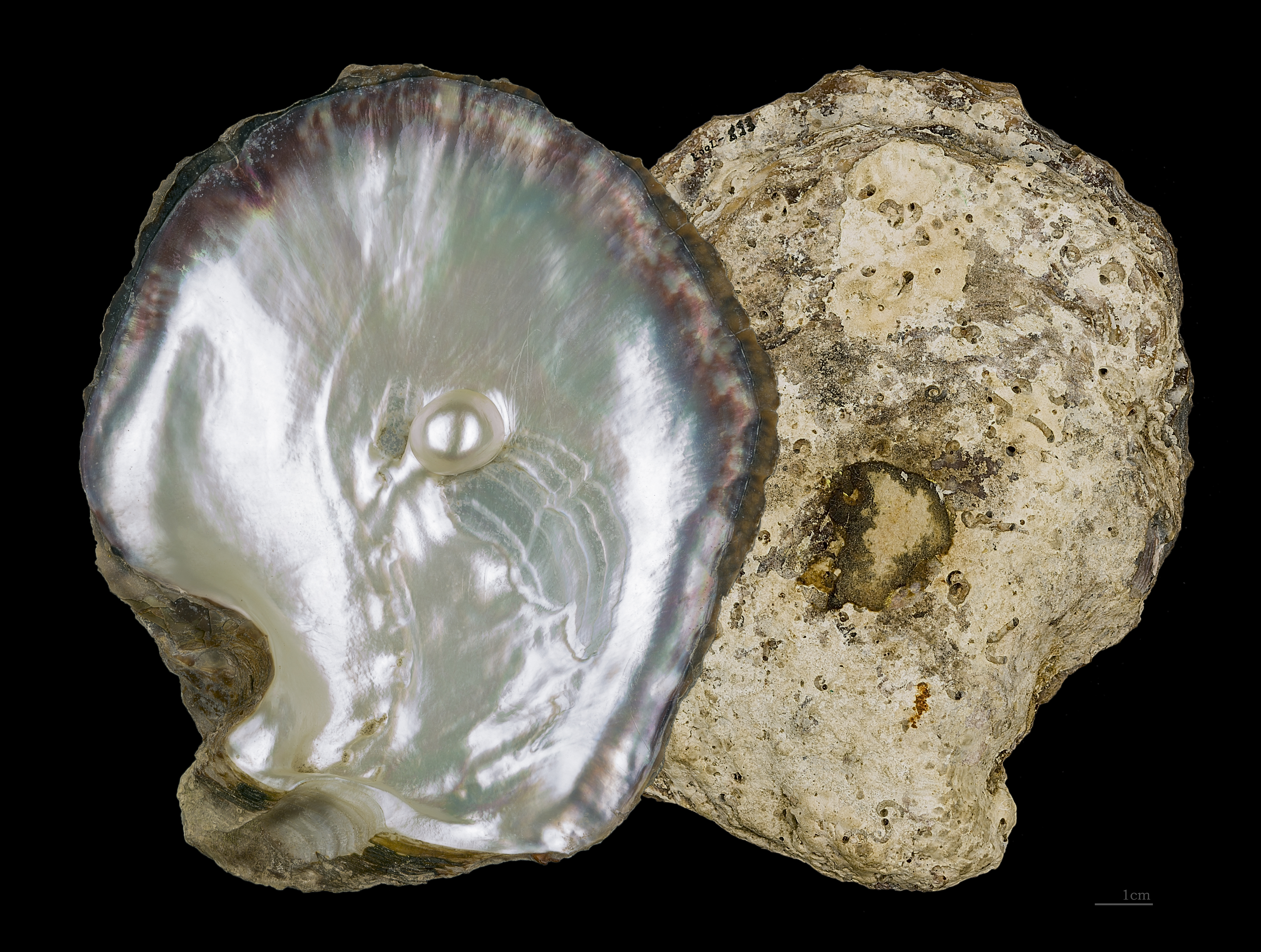
Internal appearance of shell

The common name of this species refers to the black coloring along the margins of the interior of the shell. Externally the shell is dark grayish brown or green, though white spots are common across the shell. Adults usually reach between 20 and 25 centimetres (7.9 and 9.8 in) in height. A distinctive feature of the species is that the hinge has no teeth.

(The genera Pinctada and Pteria are often confused. In Pinctada, the hinge is long and straight, the long end of the shell forms a right angle to the hinge, and the left valve is slightly deeper than the right. In the genus Pteria, the shell width is much longer than its height and the angle of the hinge is prominent and pronounced.)

== Range ==
Pinctada margaritifera occupies a wide range throughout the Persian Gulf, Red Sea, Sudan, Papua New Guinea, Australia, French Polynesia, Cook Islands, Indonesia, Andaman and Nicobar Islands, Southwestern part of the Indian Ocean, Japan and the Pacific Ocean, and various locations on the coast of India.

== Habitat ==
P. margaritifera occur in coral reef areas. These suspension feeders are able to thrive in low phytoplankton conditions. The pearl oyster attaches itself to barnacles and other hard substrates via a byssus. They thrive at intertidal and subtidal zones, at depths from the low tide to up to 75 meters. Habitats are usually characterized as oligotrophic and having low turbidity. Other species, including sponges, hydroids, polychaetes, lamellibranchs, amphipods, decapods, echinoderms, and fishes, usually have close relationships with pearl oyster beds.

== Human relevance ==
This species is commonly farmed and harvested for pearls, and there is general consensus that the quality of pearls from Pinctada margaritifera is the highest quality out of all the pearl oysters. Pearls form when a parasite or other irritant enters into the oyster and nacre is released by the oyster to coat the object, eventually creating a small pearl. It is a popular myth that sand is a common irritant that induces pearl nucleation, however, this is very rarely, if ever, the case. Bivalves are able to flush sand from their bodies extremely effectively, and studies of pearl nuclei have shown that the overwhelming majority form from parasitic incursion, other organic irritants, or even tissue damage. The oyster's release of the nacre serves as an adaptation of the immune system to isolate the invasive particle and irritation. P. margaritifera in particular produces gray or black pearls.

The benthic ecology of the region is a significant factor in the rate of production and the quality of pearls. Rocky, gravelly bottoms and low silt concentrations are preferable, and currents are necessary to keep the water clean with fresh phytoplankton and removal of fecal matter. Stronger currents cause faster but lower quality pearl development.

== Notes ==
- Yukihara, H., et al. (1999). “Feeding Adaptations of the Pearl Oysters Pinctada margaritifera and P. maxima to variations in particulates”. Marine Ecological Progress Series. Retrieved 2014-2-19.
- Ciesm (2002). “Pinctada margaritifera”. Retrieved 2014-2-19.
- Tëmkin, I. (2013). “Pinctada margaritifera (Linnaeus, 1758)”. World Register of Marine Species. Retrieved 2014-2-19.
- Fishing and Aquaculture Department (1991). “Pearl Oyster Farming and Pearl Culture”. FAO Corporate Document Repository. Retrieved 2014-2-19
- Richmond, Matthew D. (1997). A Guide to the Seashore of Eastern Africa and the Western Indian Ocean Islands.
