= Oriental Pride =

The Oriental Pride is a natural oriental pearl. It has the shape of a drop and is white in colour. It weighs approximately 181 grains (c. 42 carats) and is one of the largest pearls ever found on earth. The size, lustre and form of the pearl distinguish it from other pearls.

The origin of the Oriental Pride is most likely the Middle East, where in the region of Basra, natural pearls were found more than 100 years ago. After the rise of the oil industry in the Middle East, the pollution created by the same industry has distincted the natural pearl oysters' natural habitat. Hence there is hardly any saltwater sea left that would form a natural habitat for the oysters of natural pearls.

The likelihood that this pearl is the same pearl as the Great Mogul's pearl is very high, given the size, the form and rarity of both. There are only a handful of pearls ever found in the history of the Earth that would be so large and perfect in form and lustre. The pearl was reportedly seen in a gemstone exhibition in Hong Kong and Basel recently.
