= Keshi pearl =

Type of small non-nucleated pearls

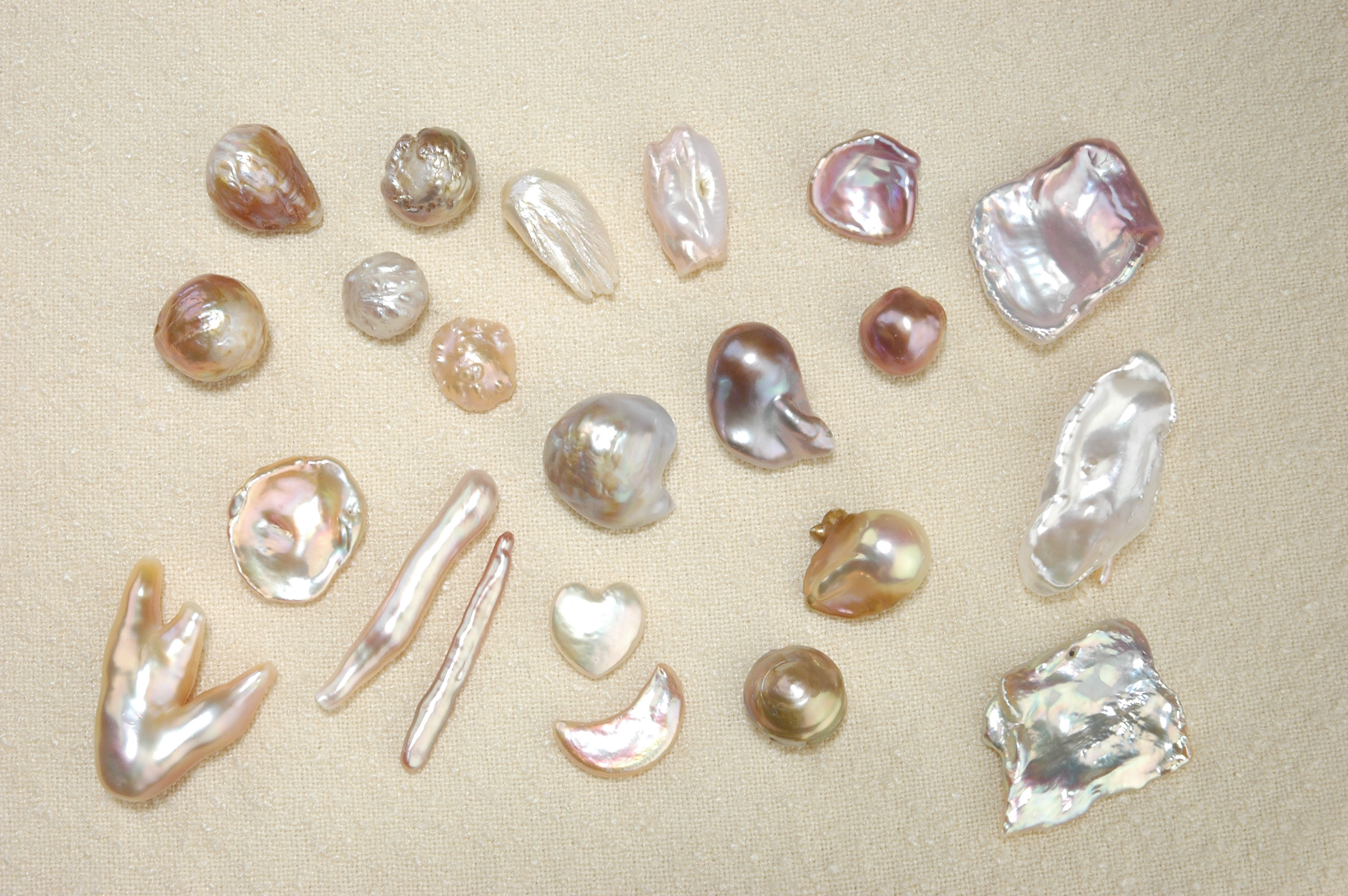
Assorted keshi pearls

Keshi pearls are small non-nucleated pearls typically formed as by-products of pearl cultivation. A Japanese word also meaning "poppy" (ケシ, 芥子), it is used in Japanese for all pearls that grew without a nucleus. Originally, keshi pearls referred to those pearls formed when a bead nucleus was rejected. More recently, keshi has been used to refer to second harvest pearls and even to freshwater non-nucleated pearls. However the latter usage referring to freshwater pearls is considered erroneous by many leading gem trade associations. Because they have no nucleus, keshi pearls are composed entirely of nacre.

== Origins ==
All of the following can cause a keshi pearl to grow:

1. An attack on a pearl-producing mollusc by a predator that bores through its shell, similar to a way in which wild natural pearls are formed, except that captive molluscs are more susceptible.
2. Accidents causing injury to molluscs, for example driving shell fragments into mantle tissue.
3. Cultivation mishaps, generally separation of the mantle tissue graft from an inserted nucleus: this causes the intended nucleated pearl to fail, and a smaller keshi pearl to grow instead.
4. Deliberate non-nucleated cultivation, still the most common type in freshwater pearl farming.
5. Keeping freshwater molluscs with pearl sacs alive after harvesting the (first round of) pearls.

Except to the extent of noting that extremely small pearls (<2mm) are not cultivated, since there is no incentive to do so because naturally occurring tiny pearls are relatively plentiful, it is usually not possible to determine which of these caused an individual keshi pearl to grow. Because most keshi pearls come from farms where they are commonly and deliberately cultivated, it is necessary to classify keshi as cultivated / cultured pearls. Any natural pearl (without nucleus) may be called a keshi pearl, but doing so would be rather meaningless without mentioning the species of mollusc in which the pearl grew, or at least its geographic provenance. Use of "keshi pearl" without provenance is confusing and should be avoided.

== Terminology ==
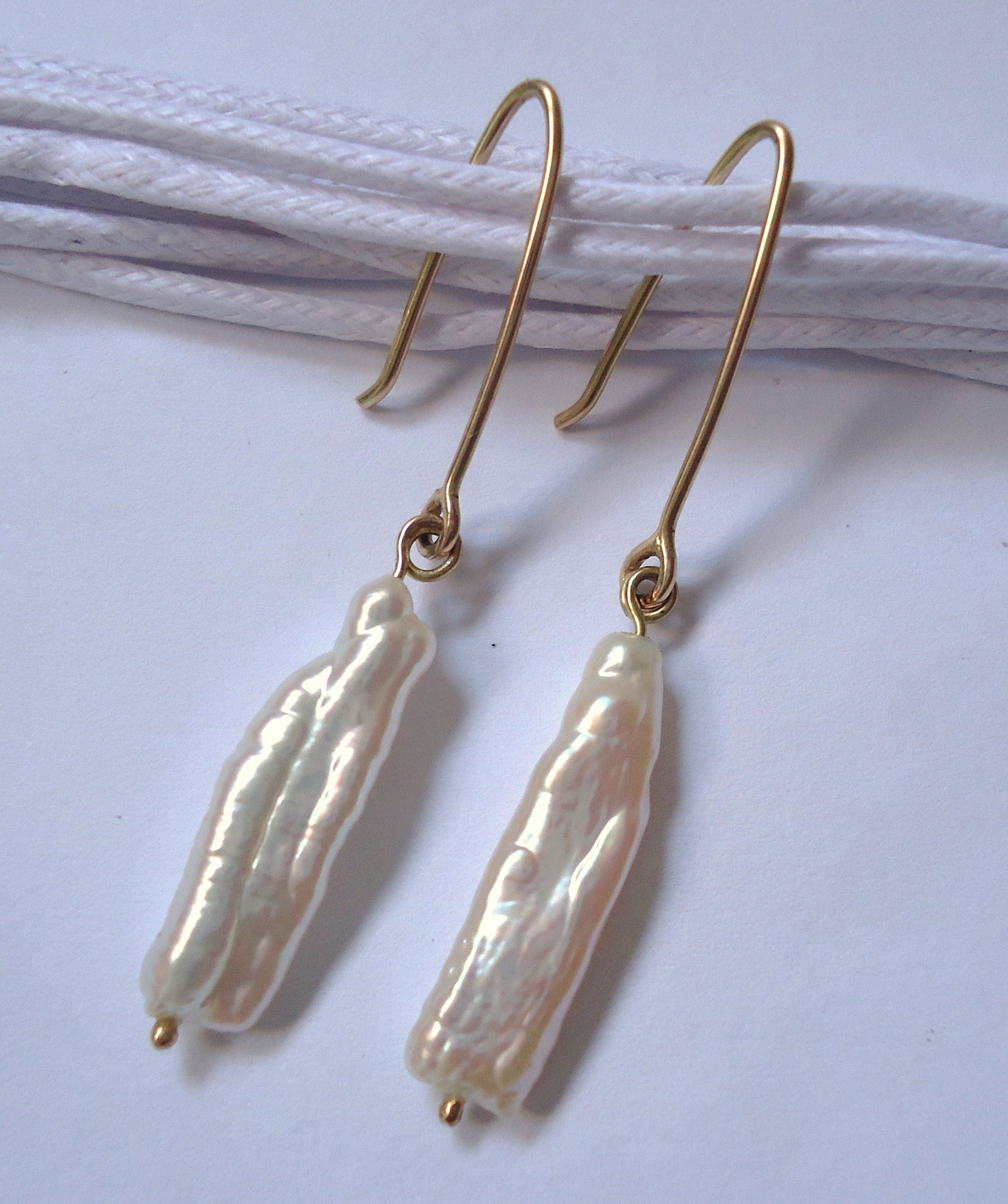
Keshi pearl earrings

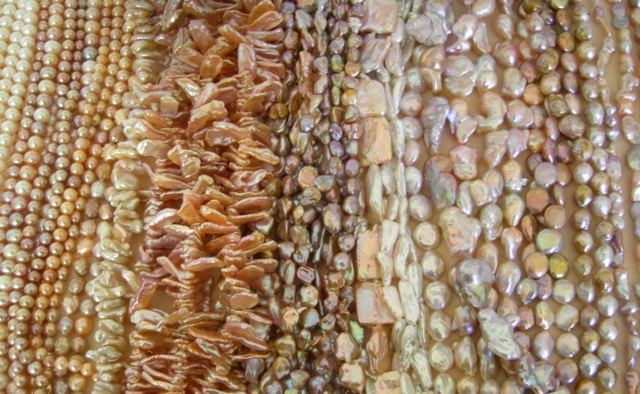
Keshi pearl strands

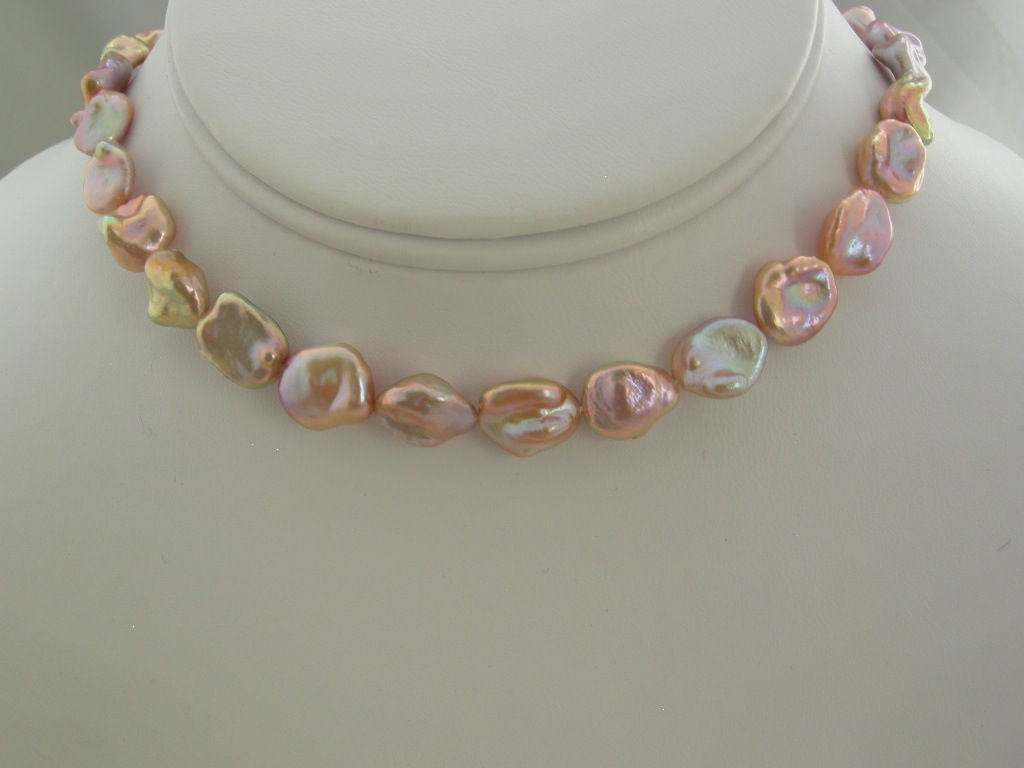
Keshi pearl necklace

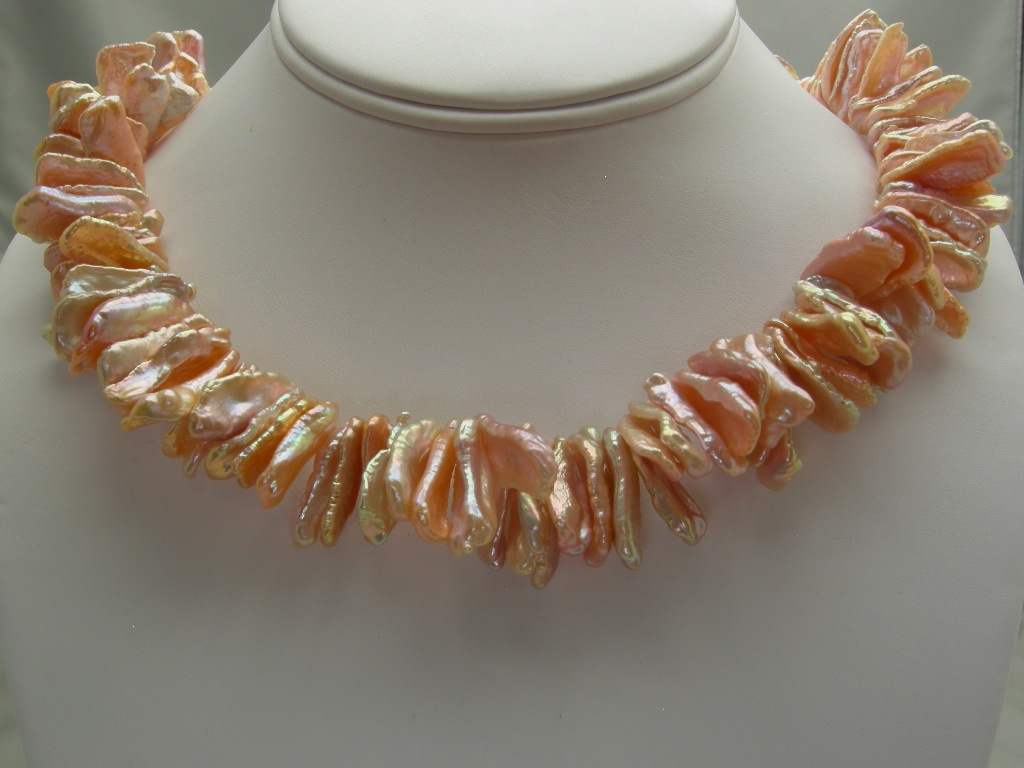
Keshi pearl necklace

The term keshi (occasionally misspelled Keishi, apparently a confusion with "Heishi beads") was first used in Japan to refer to pearls without nuclei. Akoya pearl cultivation, which began in the 1920s in Japan, provided numerous small, most often greyish pearls as a by-product. Traders from India, where natural pearls were harvested and processed during past centuries, needed no sales talk to be convinced that they could sell Japan Akoya keshi in their market and to visiting Arabs as natural pearls, because their close similarities. Having access to Indian labor capable of sorting, drilling and stringing tiny pearls, arrangements were made to send Japanese keshi pearls to India (even during many years in which imports were not sanctioned), provide processing services at conditions without rival, and covertly retain pearls for sale in India under an allowance for pearls ruined in the course of processing.

Pearl importers in consumer countries, and the trade associations they constitute, have recommended limiting the use of the term keshi to ocean pearls, and banning its use for freshwater pearls. This is justified to some extent by the fact that ocean pearl keshi were known as a product for some years before their freshwater counterparts. Japanese language usage of keshi certainly includes freshwater pearls. It has always been a generic term, not a trademark, and its application to freshwater pearls by the Chinese is based on visual similarity that is quite close.

Chinese use of keshi for freshwater pearls is generally limited to those from a second (or subsequent) harvest. These differ considerably from the plump, full shapes of first-harvest freshwater pearls, which grow during a young mussel's growth period, when nacre production is at its peak. Older mussels produce nacre more slowly, and second-harvest freshwater pearls (if not nucleated) are generally flat and often thin, with concavities and texture mostly absent from first-harvest pearls. Curiously, the Chinese use keshi to differentiate between two distinct products, while Japanese usage, requiring only the absence of a nucleus, is equally applicable to both.

== Nature vs. nurture controversy ==
Because it is impossible to determine whether an individual keshi pearl grew serendipitously or as a result of mantle tissue insertion, they are all classified as cultivated/cultured pearls. It is possible to speculate on the likelihood of keshi pearls from various cultivations based on supply and demand. Tiny "seed" pearls (<2mm) occur commonly in all types of molluscs used for pearl cultivation, both ocean and freshwater, thus there has never been a need to find a way to cultivate tiny sizes. Japan Akoya pearl production generated large numbers of tiny keshi pearls, the value of which was mostly in the labor-intensive processing, so there is little or no incentive to cultivate extra keshi. Southsea pearls on the other hand are farmed in larger molluscs, and keshi from these may reach considerable size and value. Freshwater cultivators in pre-1985 Japan commonly used up bits of active mantle tissue left over from in-body bead nucleation by slipping a few keshi into the mantle. Now the market of those keshi farmed in China is so low that they discard the leftovers rather than expending even a tiny fraction of their mussels' strength on producing freshwater keshi.

Freshwater keshi pearls from China are for the most part unquestionably cultivated, but in an indirect way. Active mantle tissue grafts in a mussel's mantle are needed in order for the first harvest of pearls (pearls not considered keshi by most Chinese dealers) to grow. Except for the insertion of nuclei in selected pearl sacs to make coin pearls and bead-nucleated "flame" pearls, keshi pearls will grow without any further intervention following the careful harvesting of the first round of pearls. Since mussels may live for many years, the process may be repeated; however the amount of nacre produced continuously falls with age, and most cultivators harvest only twice.

Keshi pearls consist of solid nacre, and tend to have high luster as a result. All nacre colors typical of the mollusc under cultivation may be represented among keshi pearls harvested from the same, but in the case of Akoya pearls a larger portion of keshi is usually grey than of bead-nucleated pearls.
