= Pearl Maxima =

One of the largest true pearls in the world

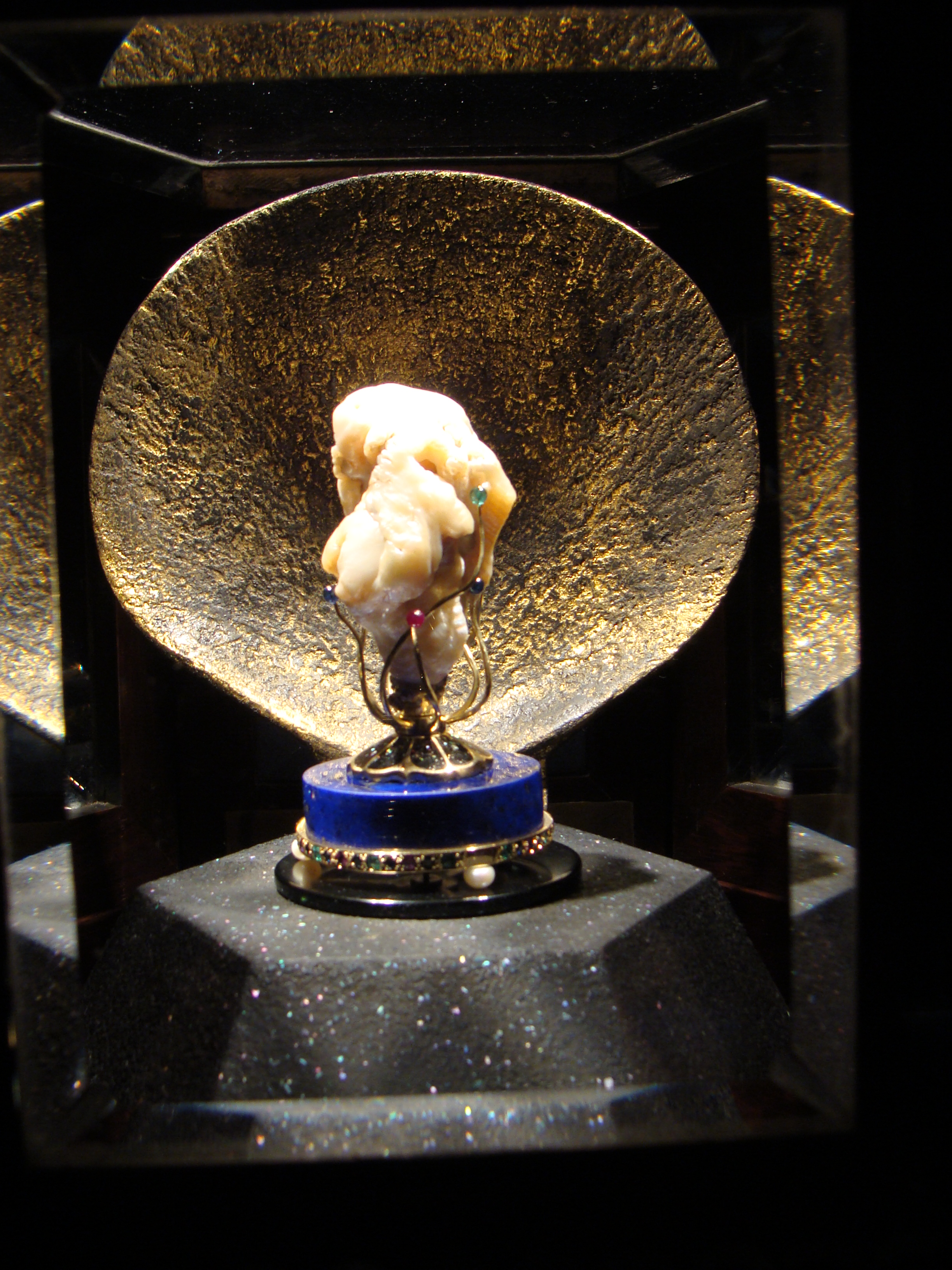
Pearl Maxima on display in the Leiden Museum "Naturalis".

Pearl Maxima is one of the largest true pearls or nacreous pearls in the world. This irregularly shaped pearl has a weight of 2385 grains (119.25 grams) and is 71 millimetres long. Its colour varies from cream to gold.

== History ==
The first known owner of the pearl was Sir Hendrik Coenraad Sander, who auctioned the pearl in Amsterdam in 1778. The Polish count Plonsky from Gdańsk was the second known owner of the pearl. In 1865, King Victor Emmanuel II of Italy bought the pearl, but around 1868 he sold it to Willem van Kooten, a Dutch goldsmith from Amsterdam. Willem van Kooten inserted the Pearl Maxima into a golden basement with precious stones. The current owner bought it from the heirs of Willem van Kooten.

Since its arrival in the Netherlands it has been on display only twice; the most recent time was from 19 December 2008 until 23 February 2009 in the National Museum of Natural History "Naturalis" in Leiden, the Netherlands.
