= Pearl =

Hard object produced within a living shelled mollusc

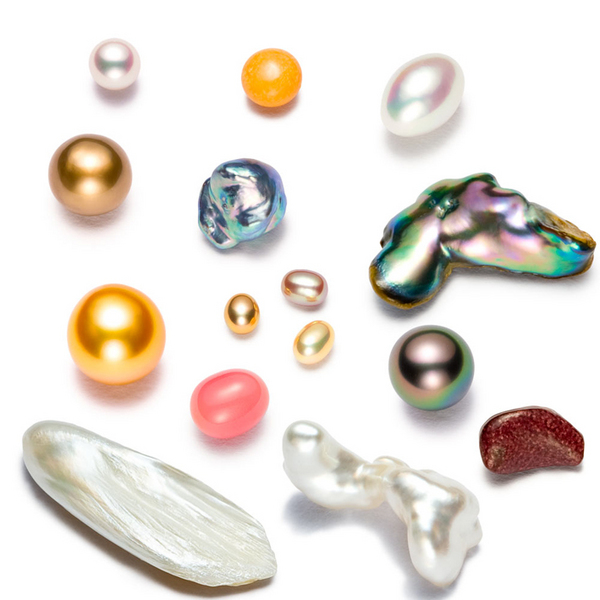
- Various pearls

General
- Category: Carbonate mineral, protein
- Formula: Calcium carbonate, CaCO_{3}; Conchiolin
- Strunz classification: 05.8
- Crystal system: Orthorhombic

Identification
- Color: White, pink, silver, cream, brown, green, blue, black, yellow, orange, red, gold, purple, iridescent
- Cleavage: None
- Fracture: Uneven, various
- Mohs scale hardness: 2.5–4.5
- Streak: White
- Specific gravity: 2.60–2.85
- Refractive index: Common pearl: 1.52–1.66; Black pearl: 1.53–1.69
- Birefringence: 0.156
- Pleochroism: Absent
- Dispersion: None
- Ultraviolet fluorescence: White pearls: light blue to light yellow; Yellow and golden pearls: yellow-green, greenish brown to dark brown; Black pearls: commonly pink to orange-red

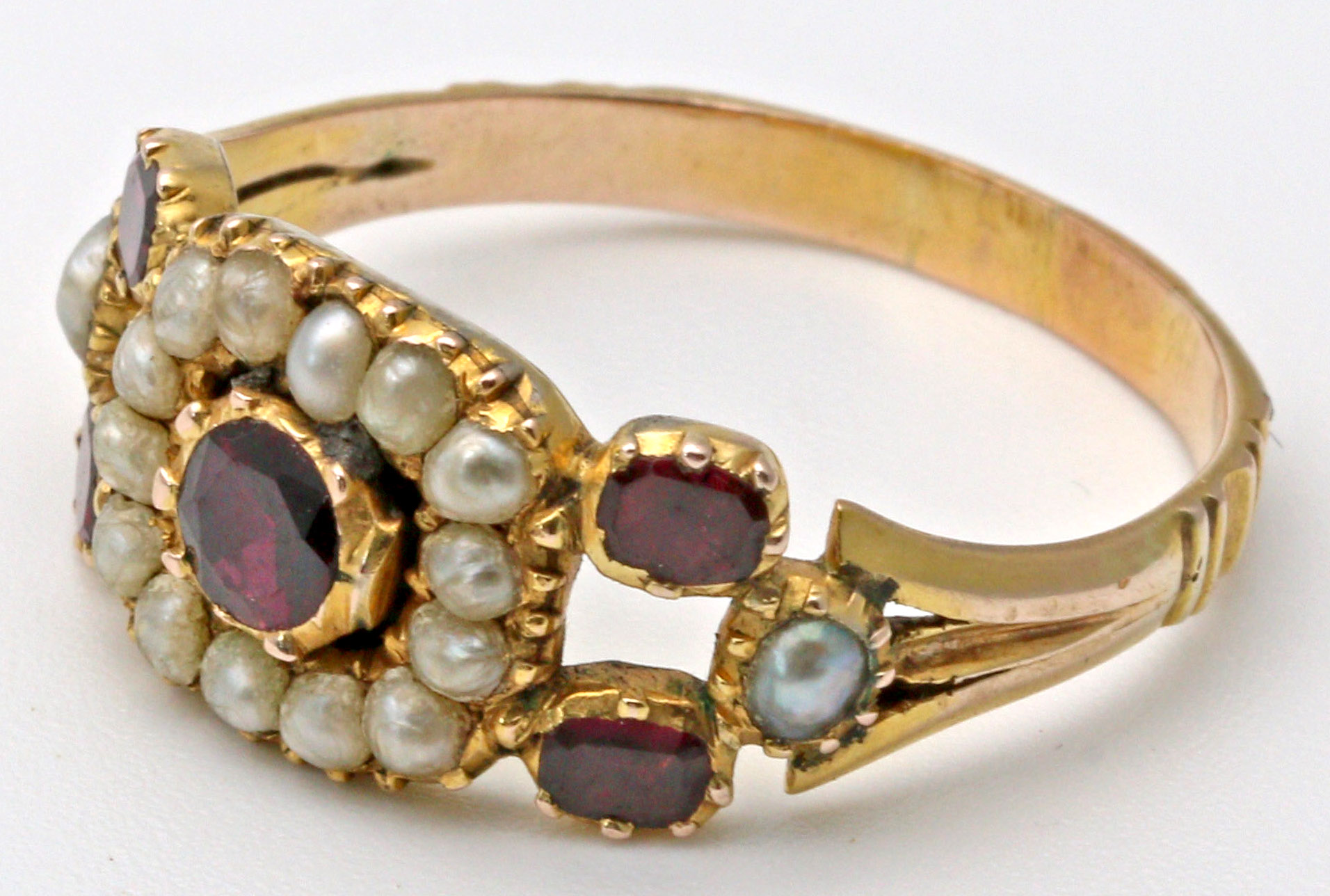
Georgian seed pearl gold ring

A pearl is a hard, shiny object produced within the soft tissue (specifically the mantle) of a living shelled mollusk. Like the shell of a mollusk, a pearl is composed of calcium carbonate (mainly aragonite or a mixture of aragonite and calcite) in a crystalline form, which is deposited in concentric layers. More commercially valuable pearls are perfectly round and smooth, but many other shapes, known as baroque pearls, can occur. The highest quality of natural pearls have been highly valued as gemstones and objects of beauty for many centuries. In literature, pearls have become a metaphor for something rare, fine, admirable, and valuable.

The most valuable pearls occur spontaneously in the wild but are extremely rare. These wild pearls are referred to as natural pearls. Cultured or farmed pearls from pearl oysters and freshwater mussels make up the majority of those currently sold. Imitation pearls are also widely sold in inexpensive jewelry. Pearls have been harvested and cultivated primarily for use in jewelry but in the past were also used to adorn clothing. They have also been crushed and used in cosmetics, medicines, and paint formulations.

Whether wild or cultured, gem-quality pearls are almost always nacreous and iridescent, like the interior of the shell that produces them. However, almost all species of shelled mollusks are capable of producing pearls (technically "calcareous concretions") of lesser shine or less spherical shape. Although these may also be legitimately referred to as "pearls" by gemological labs and also under U.S. Federal Trade Commission rules, and are formed in the same way, most of them have no value except as curiosities.

== Etymology ==
The English word pearl comes from the French perle, originally from the Latin perna 'leg', after the ham- or mutton-leg-shaped bivalve.

The scientific name for the family of pearl-bearing oysters, Margaritiferidae comes from the Old Persian word for pearl *margārīta- which is the source of the English name Margaret.

== Definition ==
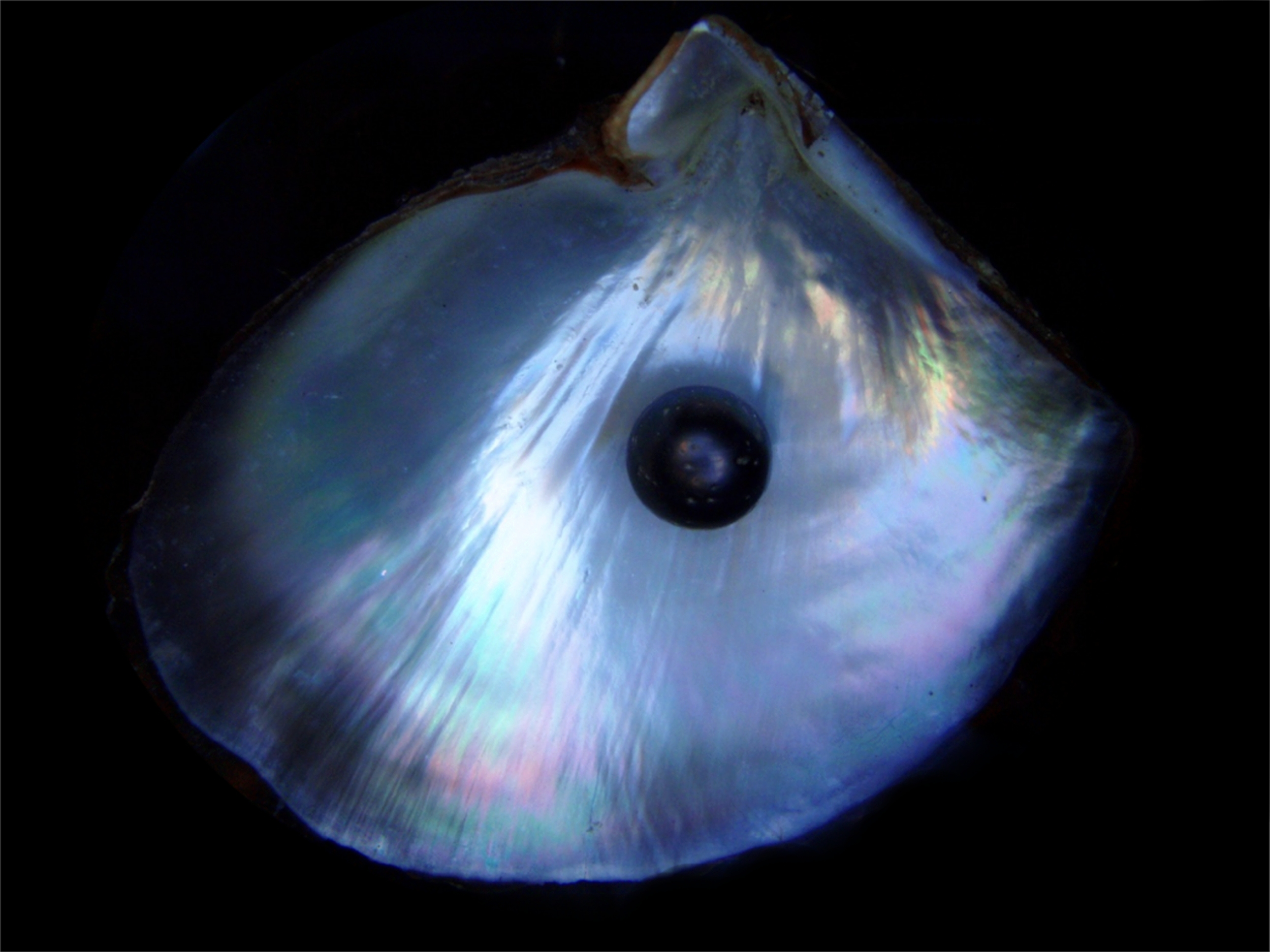
A black pearl and a shell of the black-lipped pearl oyster. The iridescent colors originate from nacre layers.

All shelled mollusks can, by natural processes, produce some kind of "pearl" when an irritating microscopic object becomes trapped within its mantle folds, but the great majority of these "pearls" are not valued as gemstones. Nacreous pearls, the best-known and most commercially significant, are primarily produced by two groups of molluskan bivalves or clams. A nacreous pearl is made from layers of nacre, by the same living process as is used in the secretion of the mother of pearl, which lines the shell.

Natural (or wild) pearls, formed without human intervention, are very rare. Many hundreds of pearl oysters or mussels must be gathered and opened, and thus killed, to find even one wild pearl. For many centuries, this was the only way pearls were obtained, and why pearls fetched such extraordinary prices in the past. Cultured pearls are formed in pearl farms, using human intervention as well as natural processes.

Saltwater pearls can grow in several species of marine pearl oysters in the family Pteriidae including the pearl oyster. Freshwater pearls grow within certain species of freshwater mussels in the order Unionida, the families Unionidae and Margaritiferidae. These are the river mussels such as the freshwater pearl mussel.

== Physical properties ==
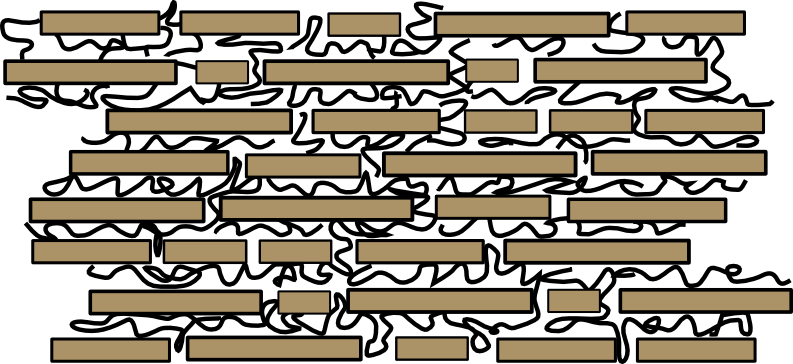
Structure of nacre layers, wherein aragonite plates are separated by biopolymers, such as chitin, lustrin and silk-like proteins

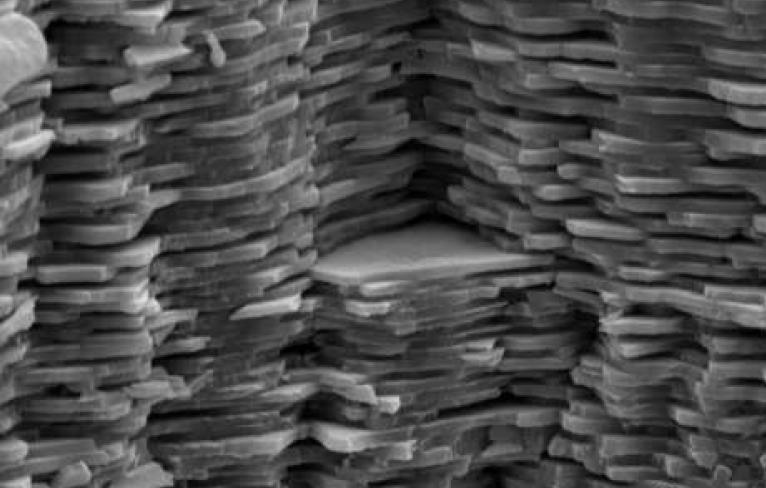
Electron microscopy image of a fractured surface of nacre

The unique luster of pearls depends upon the reflection, refraction, and diffraction of light from the translucent layers. The thinner and more numerous the layers in the pearl, the finer the luster. The iridescence that pearls display is caused by the overlapping of successive layers, which breaks up light falling on the surface. In addition, pearls (especially cultured freshwater pearls) can be dyed yellow, green, blue, brown, pink, purple, or black. The most valuable pearls have a metallic, highly reflective luster.

Because pearls are made primarily of calcium carbonate, they can be dissolved in vinegar. Calcium carbonate is susceptible to even a weak acid solution because the crystals react with the acetic acid in the vinegar to form calcium acetate and carbon dioxide.

== Freshwater and saltwater pearls ==
Freshwater and saltwater pearls may sometimes look quite similar, but they come from different sources.

Freshwater pearls form in various species of freshwater mussels, family Unionidae, which live in lakes, rivers, ponds and other bodies of fresh water. These freshwater pearl mussels occur not only in hotter climates but also in colder, more temperate areas such as Scotland (where they are protected under law). Most freshwater cultured pearls sold today come from China. Freshwater mussel shells are also widely used in the manufacture of pearl and buttons. In India, Mehsi is home to the country's only traditional pearl button manufacturing cluster and remains the principal centre of the industry. Mehsi-made pearl buttons are supplied to domestic and international markets, including Japan and several European countries.

Saltwater pearls grow within pearl oysters, family Pteriidae, which live in oceans. Saltwater pearl oysters are cultivated in protected lagoons, volcanic atolls or in the ocean.

== Formation ==
Formation of non–bead-cultured Akoya "keshi" pearls produced in a P. i. fucata mollusk. (A) Optical overview of a nonbeaded keshi–cultured pearl. (B) Cross-section showing CaCO3 growth begins onto an organic center. (C) Mature nacre. (D and E) Atomic-resolution image of atoms in nacre. (F) Transition from spherulitic aragonite structures to nacre. (G and H) Aggregated nanoparticles form massive aragonite. (I) The formation of nacre begins directly on massive aragonite.

The mollusk's mantle (protective membrane) deposits layers of calcium carbonate (CaCO_{3}) in the form of the mineral aragonite or a mixture of aragonite and calcite (polymorphs with the same chemical formula, but different crystal structures) held together by an organic horn-like compound called conchiolin. The combination of aragonite and conchiolin is called nacre, which makes up mother-of-pearl. The commonly held belief that a grain of sand acts as the irritant is rarely the case. Typical stimuli include organic material, parasites, or even damage that displaces mantle tissue to another part of the mollusk's body. These small particles or organisms gain entry when the shell valves are open for feeding or respiration. In cultured pearls, the irritant is typically an introduced piece of the mantle epithelium, with or without a spherical bead (beaded or beadless cultured pearls).

=== Natural pearls ===
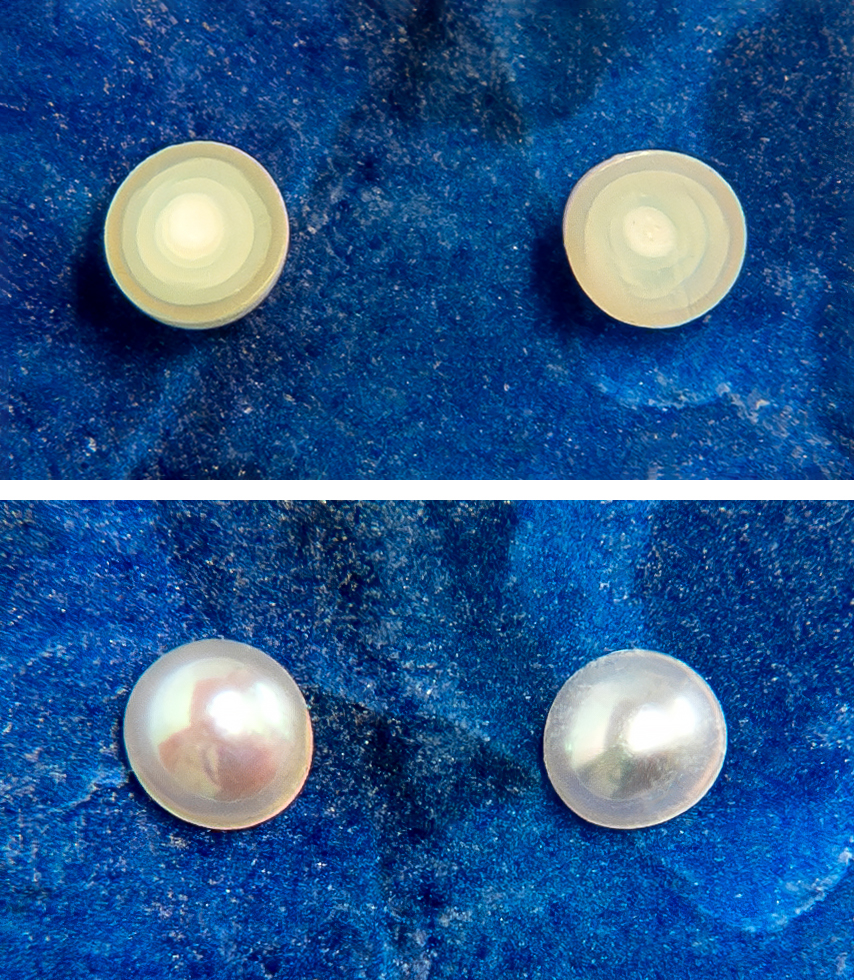
Two halved river pearls, natural freshwater pearls, on a slab of lapis lazuli. The pearls are about 2.5–3 mm (0.098–0.118 in) in diameter. The growth layers are clearly visible.

Natural pearls are nearly 100% calcium carbonate and conchiolin. It is thought that natural pearls form under a set of accidental conditions when a microscopic intruder or parasite enters a bivalve mollusk and settles inside the shell. The mollusk, irritated by the intruder, forms a pearl sac of external mantle tissue cells and secretes the calcium carbonate and conchiolin to cover the irritant. This secretion process is repeated many times, thus producing a pearl. Natural pearls come in many shapes, with perfectly round ones being comparatively rare.

Typically, the build-up of a natural pearl consists of a brown central zone formed by columnar calcium carbonate (usually calcite, sometimes columnar aragonite) and a yellowish to white outer zone consisting of nacre (tabular aragonite). In a pearl cross-section such as the diagram, these two different materials can be seen. The presence of columnar calcium carbonate rich in organic material indicates juvenile mantle tissue that formed during the early stage of pearl development. Displaced living cells with a well-defined task may continue to perform their function in their new location, often resulting in a cyst. Such displacement may occur via an injury. The fragile rim of the shell is exposed and is prone to damage and injury. Crabs, other predators and parasites such as worm larvae may produce traumatic attacks and cause injuries in which some external mantle tissue cells are disconnected from their layer. Embedded in the conjunctive tissue of the mantle, these cells may survive and form a small pocket in which they continue to secrete calcium carbonate, their natural product. The pocket is called a pearl sac and grows with time by cell division. The juvenile mantle tissue cells, according to their stage of growth, secrete columnar calcium carbonate from the pearl sac's inner surface. In time, the pearl sac's external mantle cells proceed to the formation of tabular aragonite. When the transition to nacre secretion occurs, the brown pebble becomes covered with a nacreous coating. During this process, the pearl sac seems to travel into the shell; however, the sac actually stays in its original relative position in the mantle tissue while the shell itself grows. After a couple of years, a pearl forms, and the shell may be found by a lucky pearl fisher.

=== Cultured pearls ===
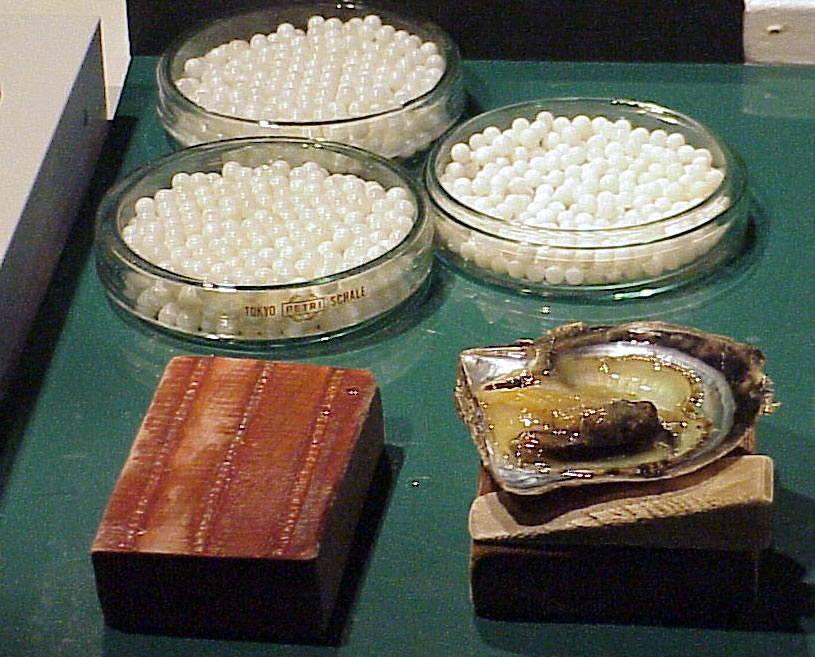
Nuclei from Mikimoto Pearl Island, Toba, Japan

Cultured pearls are the response of the shell to a tissue implant. A tiny piece of mantle tissue (called a graft) from a donor shell is transplanted into a recipient shell, causing a pearl sac to form into which the tissue precipitates calcium carbonate. There are a number of methods for producing cultured pearls: using freshwater or seawater shells, transplanting the graft into the mantle or into the gonad, and adding a spherical bead as a nucleus. Most saltwater cultured pearls are grown with beads. Trade names of cultured pearls are Akoya (阿古屋), white or golden South Sea, and black Tahitian. Most beadless cultured pearls are mantle-grown in freshwater shells in China and are known as freshwater cultured pearls.

Cultured pearls can be distinguished from natural pearls by X-ray examination. Nucleated cultured pearls are often 'preformed' as they tend to follow the shape of the implanted shell bead nucleus. After a bead is inserted into the oyster, it secretes a few layers of nacre around the bead; the resulting cultured pearl can then be harvested in as few as twelve to eighteen months.

When a cultured pearl with a bead nucleus is X-rayed, it reveals a different structure to that of a natural pearl. A beaded cultured pearl shows a solid center with no concentric growth rings, whereas a natural pearl shows a series of concentric growth rings. A beadless cultured pearl (whether of freshwater or saltwater origin) may show growth rings, but also a complex central cavity, witness of the first precipitation of the young pearl sac.

=== Imitation pearls ===
Some imitation pearls (also called shell pearls) are simply made of mother-of-pearl, coral, or conch shell, while others are made from glass and are coated with a solution containing fish scales called essence d'Orient.

=== Gemological identification ===
A well-equipped gem testing laboratory can distinguish natural pearls from cultured pearls by using gemological X-ray equipment to examine the center of a pearl. With X-rays, it is possible to see the growth rings of the pearl, where the layers of calcium carbonate are separated by thin layers of conchiolin. The differentiation of natural pearls from non-beaded cultured pearls can be very difficult without the use of this X-ray technique.

Natural and cultured pearls can be distinguished from imitation pearls using a microscope. Another method of testing for imitations is to rub two pearls against each other. Imitation pearls are completely smooth, but natural and cultured pearls are composed of nacre platelets, making both feel slightly gritty.

=== Value of a natural pearl ===
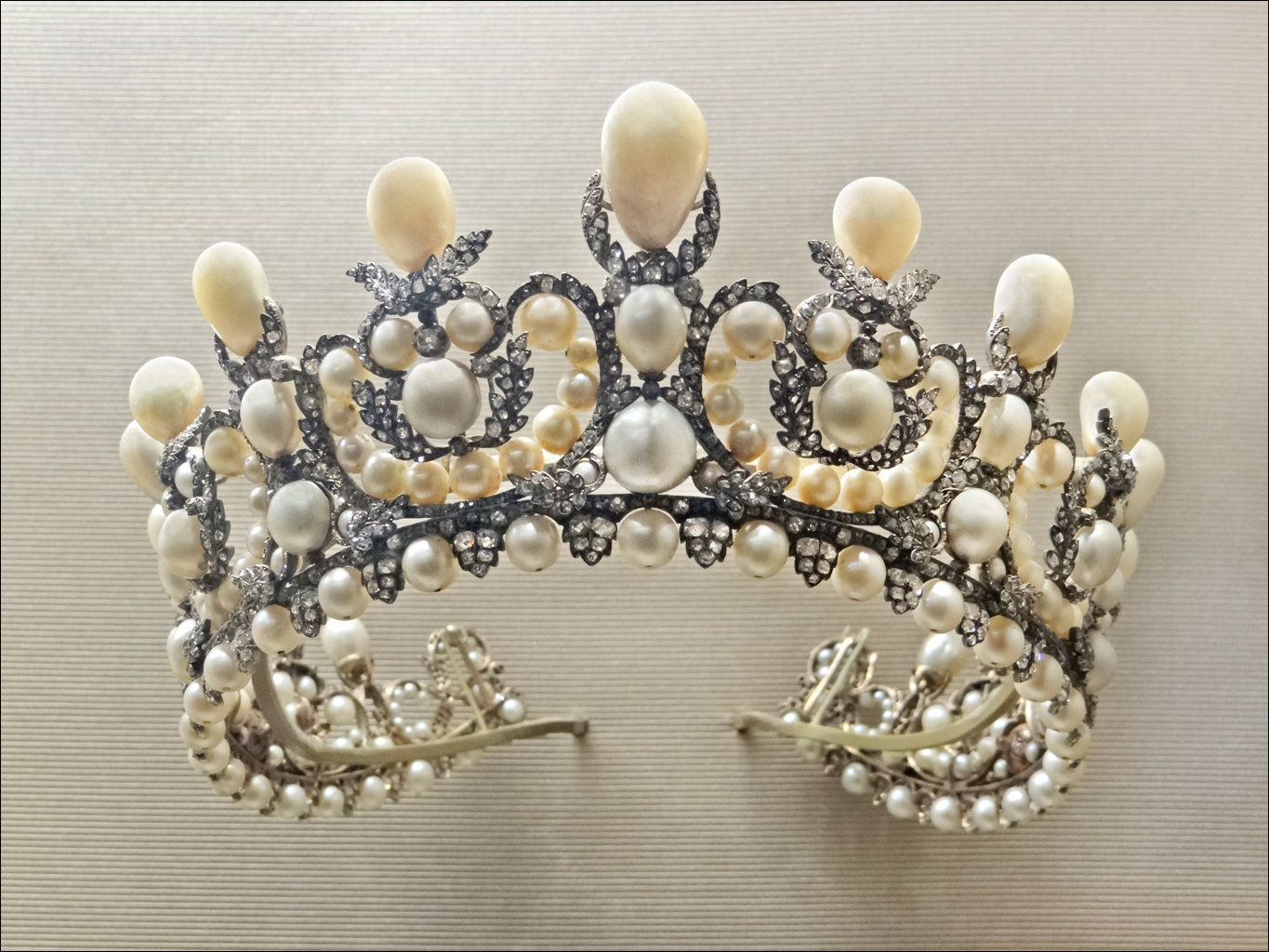
Pearl tiara of Empress Eugénie (1853) featuring 212 natural pearls, Louvre, Paris

Fine quality natural pearls are very rare jewels. Their values are determined similarly to those of other precious gems, according to size, shape, color, quality of surface, orient, and luster.

Single natural pearls are often sold as collector's items or set as centerpieces in unique jewelry. Very few matched strands of natural pearls exist, and those that do often sell for hundreds of thousands of dollars. (In 1917, jeweler Pierre Cartier purchased the Fifth Avenue mansion that is now the New York Cartier store in exchange for a matched double strand of natural pearls Cartier had been collecting for years; at the time, it was valued at US$1 million.)

The introduction and advancement of cultured pearls hit the pearl industry hard. Pearl dealers publicly disputed the authenticity of these new cultured products and left many consumers uneasy and confused about their much lower prices. Essentially, the controversy damaged the images of both natural and cultured pearls. By the 1950s, when a significant number of women in developed countries could afford their own cultured pearl necklace, natural pearls were reduced to a small, exclusive niche in the pearl industry.

=== Origin of a natural pearl ===
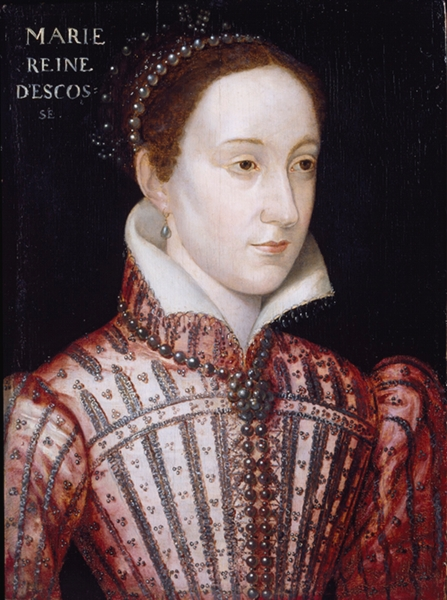
Mary, Queen of Scots, wearing a rope of pearls

Previously, natural pearls were found in many parts of the world. Present-day natural pearling is confined mostly to the Persian Gulf, in seas off Bahrain. Australia also has one of the world's last remaining fleets of pearl diving ships. Australian pearl divers dive for South Sea pearl oysters to be used in the cultured South Sea pearl industry. The catch of pearl oysters is similar to the numbers of oysters taken during the natural pearl days. Hence, significant numbers of natural pearls from wild oysters are still found in the Australian Indian Ocean waters. X-ray examination is required to positively verify natural pearls found today.

=== Types of cultured pearls ===
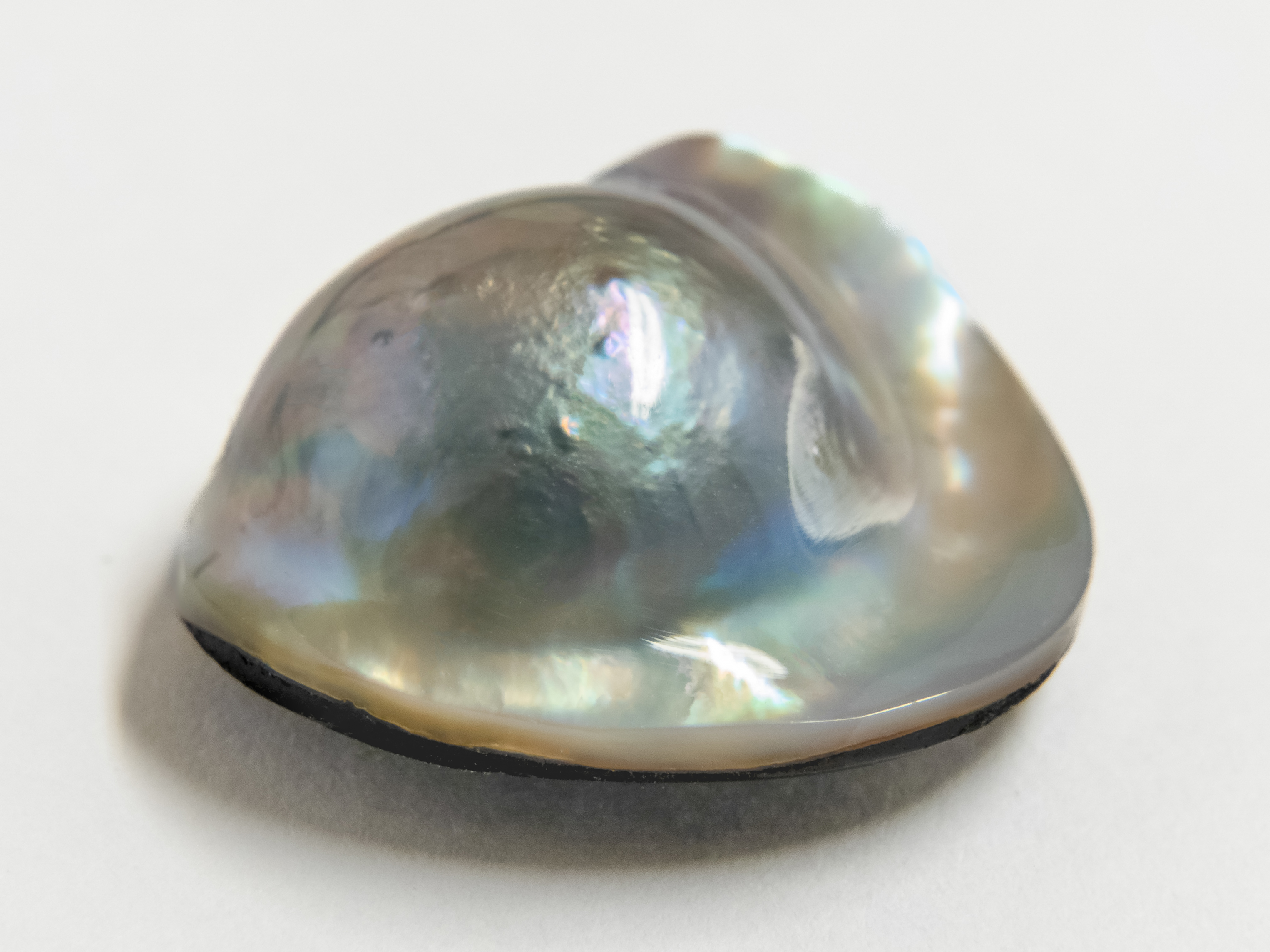
A blister pearl, a half-sphere, formed flush against the shell of the pearl oyster.

A keshi pearl is a pearl composed entirely of nacre and results from mishaps in the culturing process. Most are quite small, typically only a few millimeters in diameter, and are often irregular in shape. In seeding a cultured pearl, a piece of mantle muscle from a sacrificed oyster is placed with a bead of mother of pearl within a host oyster. If the piece of mantle should slip off the bead, a keshi pearl forms of baroque shape about the mantle piece. Therefore, while a keshi pearl could be considered superior to cultured pearls with a mother-of-pearl bead center, in the cultured pearl industry, the oyster's resources used to create a mistaken all-nacre baroque pearl is a drain on the production of the intended round cultured pearl. Therefore, the pearl industry is making ongoing attempts to improve culturing techniques so that keshi pearls do not occur. All-nacre pearls may one day be limited to natural found pearls. Today many "keshi" pearls are intentional, with post-harvest shells returned to the water to regenerate a pearl in the existing pearl sac.

Tahitian pearls, frequently referred to as black pearls, are highly valued because of their rarity; the culturing process for them dictates a smaller volume output and they can never be mass-produced because, in common with most sea pearls, the oyster can only be nucleated with one pearl at a time, while freshwater mussels are capable of multiple pearl implants. Before the days of cultured pearls, black pearls were rare and highly valued for the simple reason that white pearl oysters rarely produced naturally black pearls, and black pearl oysters rarely produced any natural pearls at all.

Since the development of pearl culture technology, the black pearl oysters Pinctada margaritifera found in Tahiti and many other Pacific islands, including the Cook Islands and Fiji are being extensively used for producing cultured pearls. The rarity of the black cultured pearl is now a "comparative" issue. The black cultured pearl is rare when compared to Chinese freshwater cultured pearls and Japanese and Chinese akoya cultured pearls and is more valuable than these pearls. However, it is more abundant than the South Sea pearl, which is more valuable than the black cultured pearl. This is simply because the black pearl oyster Pinctada margaritifera is far more abundant than the elusive, rare, and larger South Sea pearl oyster Pinctada maxima, which cannot be found in lagoons, but which must be dived for in a rare number of deep ocean habitats or grown in hatcheries. Black cultured pearls from the black pearl oyster Pinctada margaritifera are not South Sea pearls, although they are often mistakenly described as black South Sea pearls.

Natural black pearls are rare and have a body color that may be assessed as silver, silver blue, gold, brown-black, green-black, or black.

The correct definition of a South Sea pearl – as described by CIBJO and GIA – is a pearl produced by the Pinctada maxima pearl oyster. South Sea pearls are the color of their host Pinctada maxima oyster and can be white, silver, pink, gold, cream, and any combination of these basic colors, including overtones of the various colors of the rainbow displayed in the pearl nacre of the oyster shell itself.

South Sea pearls are the largest and rarest of the cultured pearls, making them the most valuable. Prized for their "orient" or lustre, South Sea pearls are now farmed in various parts of the world where the Pinctada maxima oysters can be found, with the finest South Sea pearls being produced by Paspaley along the remote coastline of North-Western Australia, and Cygnet Bay Pearl Farm on the Dampier Peninsula of Western Australia. White and silver colored South Sea pearls tend to come from the Broome area of Australia, while golden colored ones are more prevalent in the Philippines and Indonesia.

A farm in the Gulf of California, Mexico, is culturing pearls from the black lipped Pinctada mazatlanica oysters and the rainbow-lipped Pteria sterna oysters. Also called Concha Nácar, the pearls from these rainbow-lipped oysters fluoresce red under ultraviolet light.

Akoya pearls are a type of cultured pearl produced by the Pinctada fucata, native to the coastal waters of Japan and China, and grown around the world, including in Eastern Australia, at farms like Broken Bay Pearl Farm. They are among the earliest commercially cultured pearls, with large-scale cultivation beginning in the early 20th century following innovations by Kokichi Mikimoto and others. Akoya pearls are typically spherical or near-spherical in shape and are known for their high lustre and reflective surfaces. They generally range from 2 to 10 millimeters in diameter and are most commonly cream or white in colour, often with pink, silver, blue or green overtones. Due to their consistent shape and brilliance, Akoya pearls are widely used in traditional pearl jewellery such as pearl strands and stud earrings.

== From other species ==
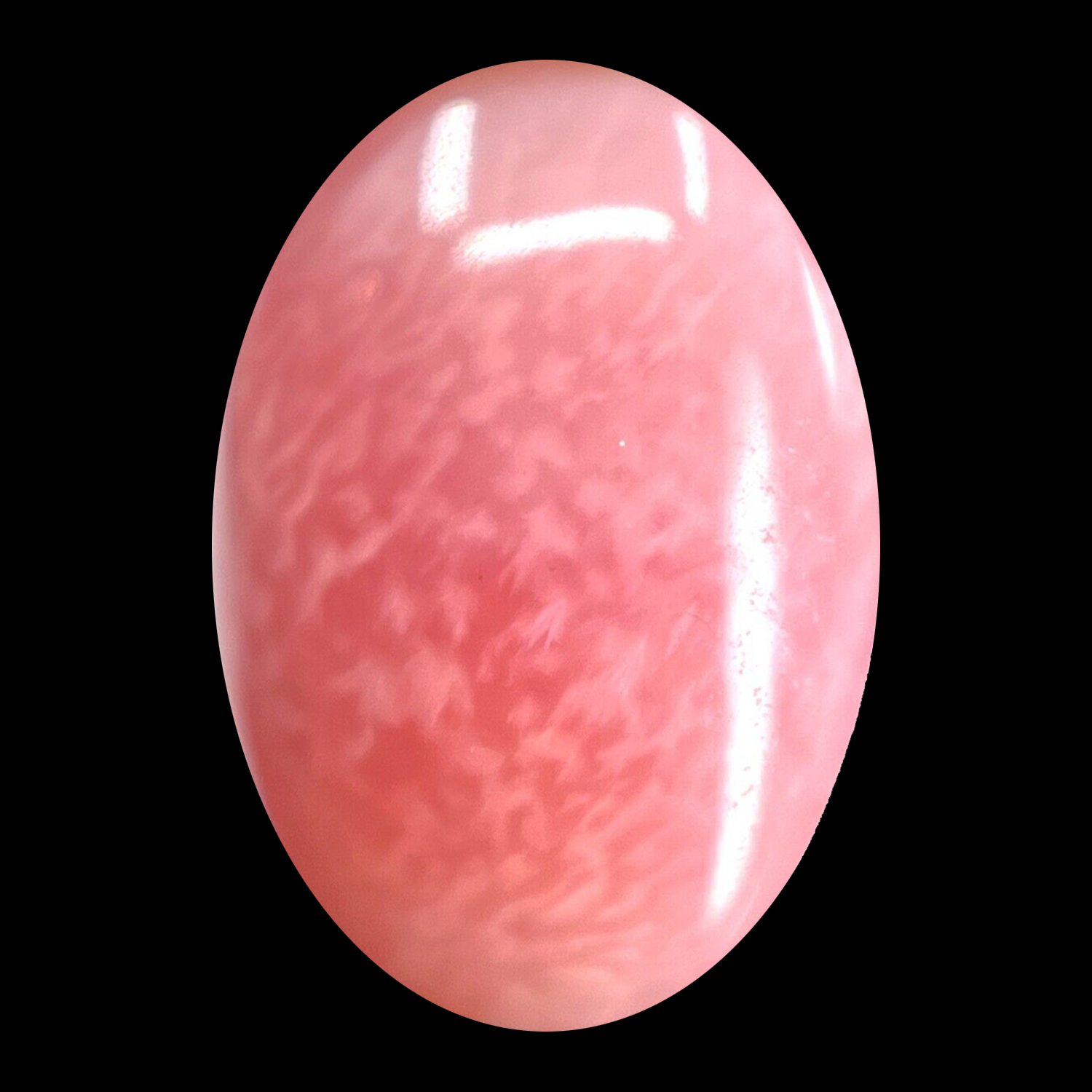
A natural conch pearl with gem flame patterning

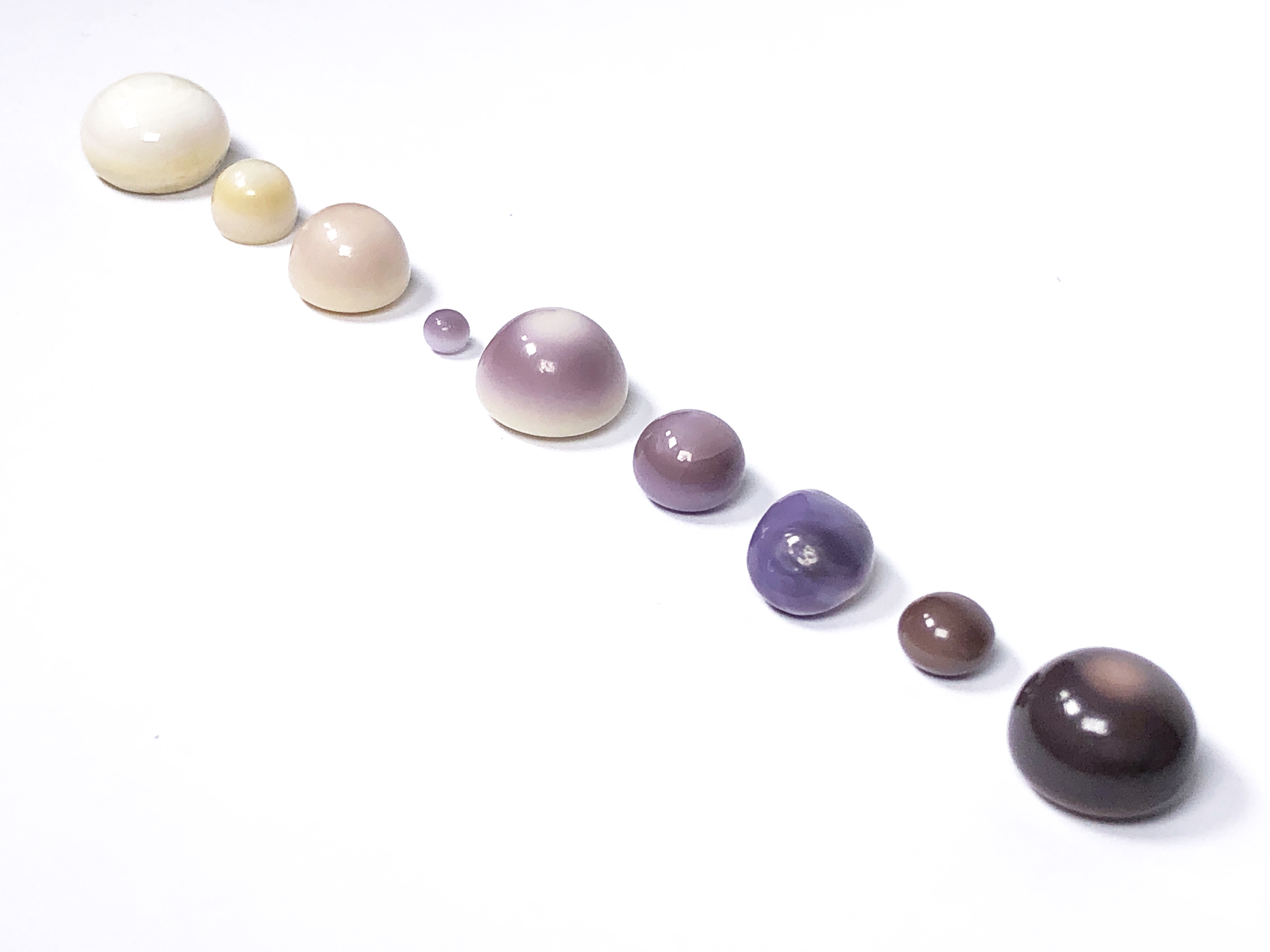
A collection of natural quahog pearls

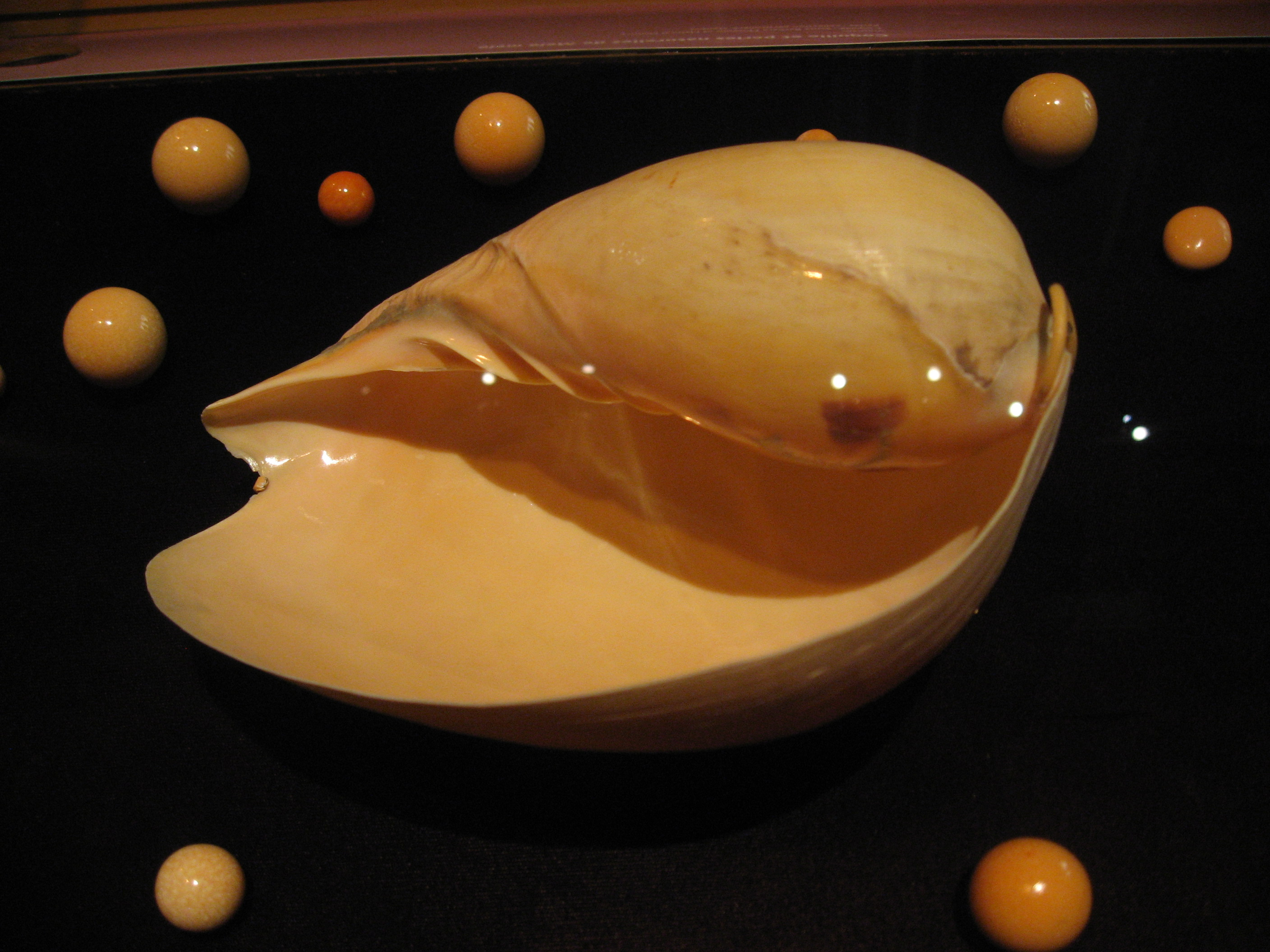
A shell of the Indian volute, Melo melo, surrounded by several pearls from this species

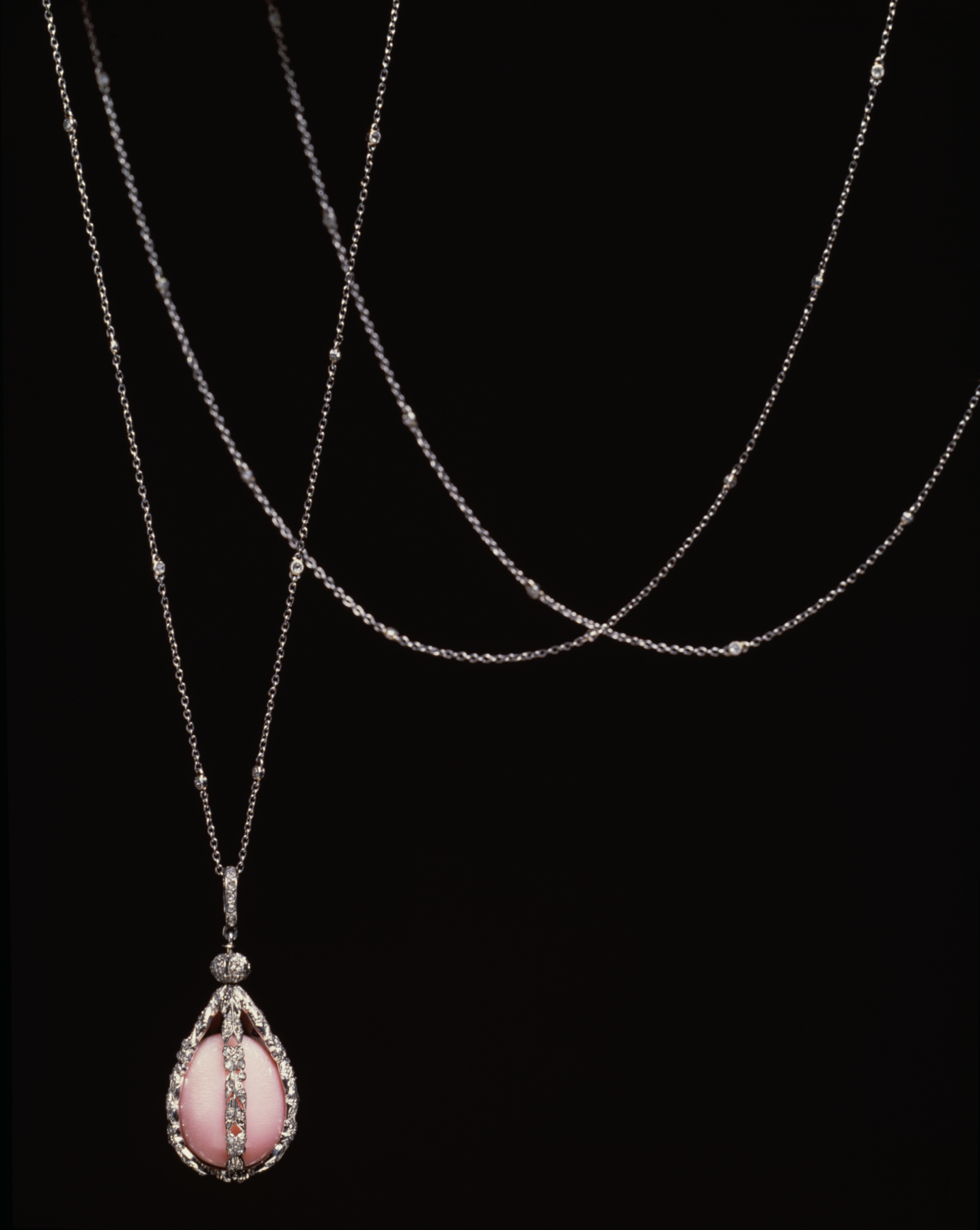
Conch pearl pendant

Biologically speaking, under the right set of circumstances, almost any shelled mollusk can produce some kind of pearl. However, most of these molluscan pearls have no luster or iridescence. The great majority of mollusk species produce pearls that are not attractive and are sometimes not even very durable. Such pearls usually have no value at all, except perhaps to a scientist or collector or as a curiosity. These objects used to be referred to as "calcareous concretions" by some gemologists, even though a malacologist would still consider them to be pearls. Valueless pearls of this type are sometimes found in edible mussels, edible oysters, escargot snails, and so on. The GIA and CIBJO now simply use the term 'pearl' (or, where appropriate, the more descriptive term 'non-nacreous pearl') when referring to such items and, under Federal Trade Commission rules, various mollusk pearls may be referred to as 'pearls', without qualification.

A few species produce pearls that can be of interest as gemstones. These species include the bailer shell Melo, the giant clam Tridacna, various scallop species, Pen shells Pinna, and the Haliotis iris species of abalone. Pearls of abalone are cultured pearls, or blister pearls, unique to New Zealand waters, and are commonly referred to as 'blue pearls'. They are admired for their luster and naturally bright vibrant colors that are often compared to opal. Another example is the conch pearl (sometimes referred to simply as the 'pink pearl'), which is found very rarely growing between the mantle and the shell of the queen conch or pink conch, Strombus gigas, a large sea snail or marine gastropod from the Caribbean Sea. These pearls, which are often pink in color, are a by-product of the conch fishing industry, and the best of them display a shimmering optical effect related to chatoyance known as 'flame structure'.

Somewhat similar gastropod pearls, this time more orange in hue, are (again very rarely) found in the horse conch Triplofusus papillosus.

The second largest pearl known was found in the Philippines in 1934 and is known as the Pearl of Lao Tzu. It is a naturally occurring, non-nacreous, calcareous concretion (pearl) from a giant clam. Because it did not grow in a pearl oyster, it is not pearly; instead, the surface is glossy like porcelain. Other pearls from giant clams are known to exist, but this is a particularly large one, weighing 14 lb (6.4 kg).

The largest known pearl (also from a giant clam) is the Pearl of Puerto, also found in the Philippines by a fisherman from Puerto Princesa, Palawan Island. The enormous pearl is 30 cm wide (1 ft), 67 cm long (2.2 ft) and weighs 75 lb (34 kg).

The extinct conulariids, a group of cnidarians closely related to stalked jellyfish, also possessed the ability to produce pearls. However, these pearls are composed of calcium phosphate, and this combined with their age and crystal structure makes them rather unattractive for use in decoration.

== History ==
=== Pearl hunting ===
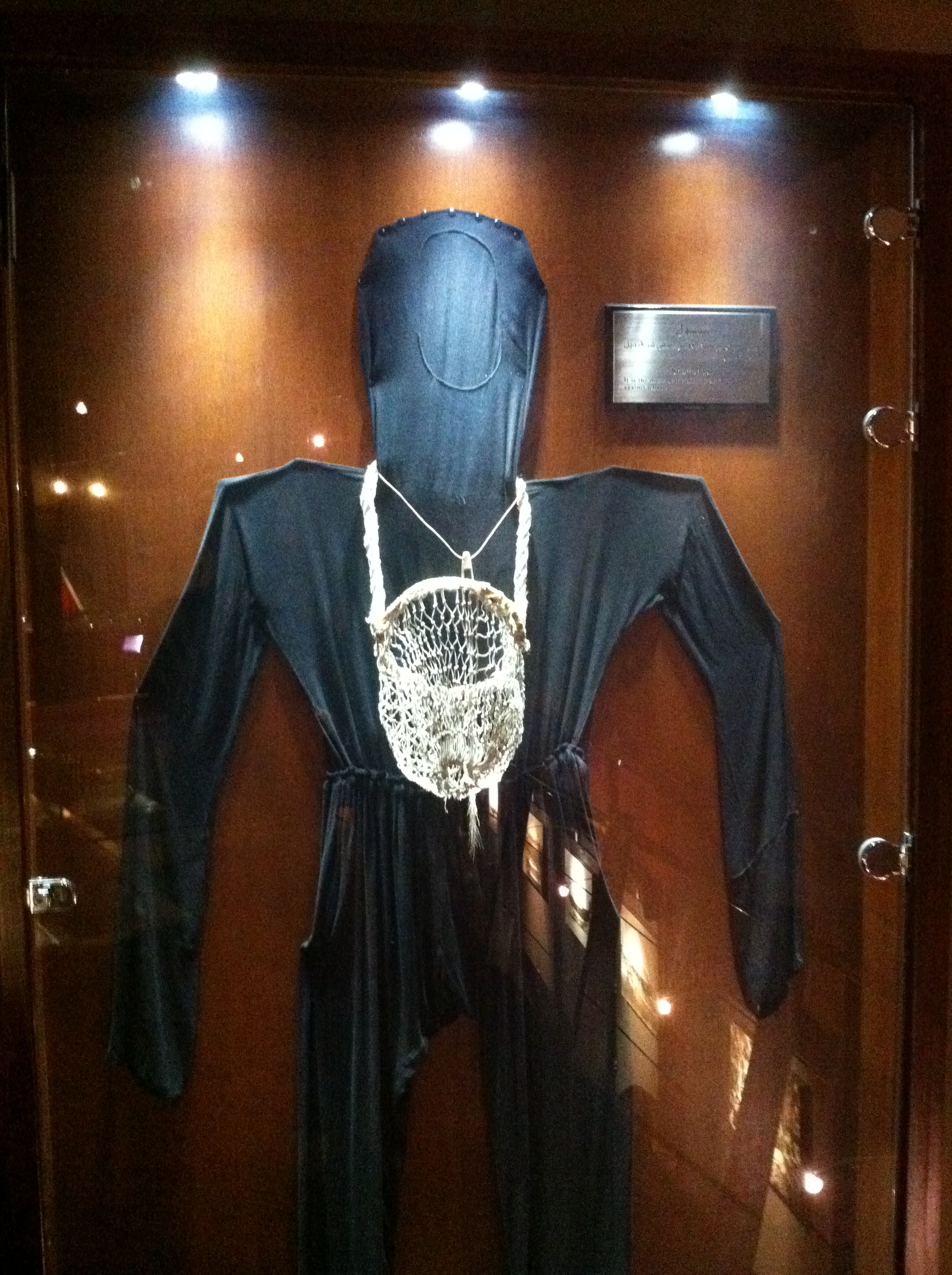
A 14th-century piece of clothing used by Kuwaiti divers searching for pearls in the Persian Gulf

The ancient chronicle Mahavamsa mentions the thriving pearl industry in the port of Oruwella in the Gulf of Mannar in Sri Lanka. It also records that eight varieties of pearls accompanied Prince Vijaya's embassy to the Pandyan king as well as king Devanampiya Tissa's embassy to Emperor Ashoka. Pliny the Elder (23–79 AD) praised the pearl fishery of the Gulf as most productive in the world.

For thousands of years, seawater pearls were retrieved by divers in the Indian Ocean in areas such as the Persian Gulf, the Red Sea and the Gulf of Mannar. Evidence also suggest a prehistoric origin to pearl diving in these regions. Starting in the Han dynasty (206 BC–220 AD), the Chinese hunted extensively for seawater pearls in the South China Sea, particularly in what is now Tolo Harbour in Hong Kong. Tanka pearl divers of twelfth century China attached ropes to their waists to be safely brought back up to the surface.

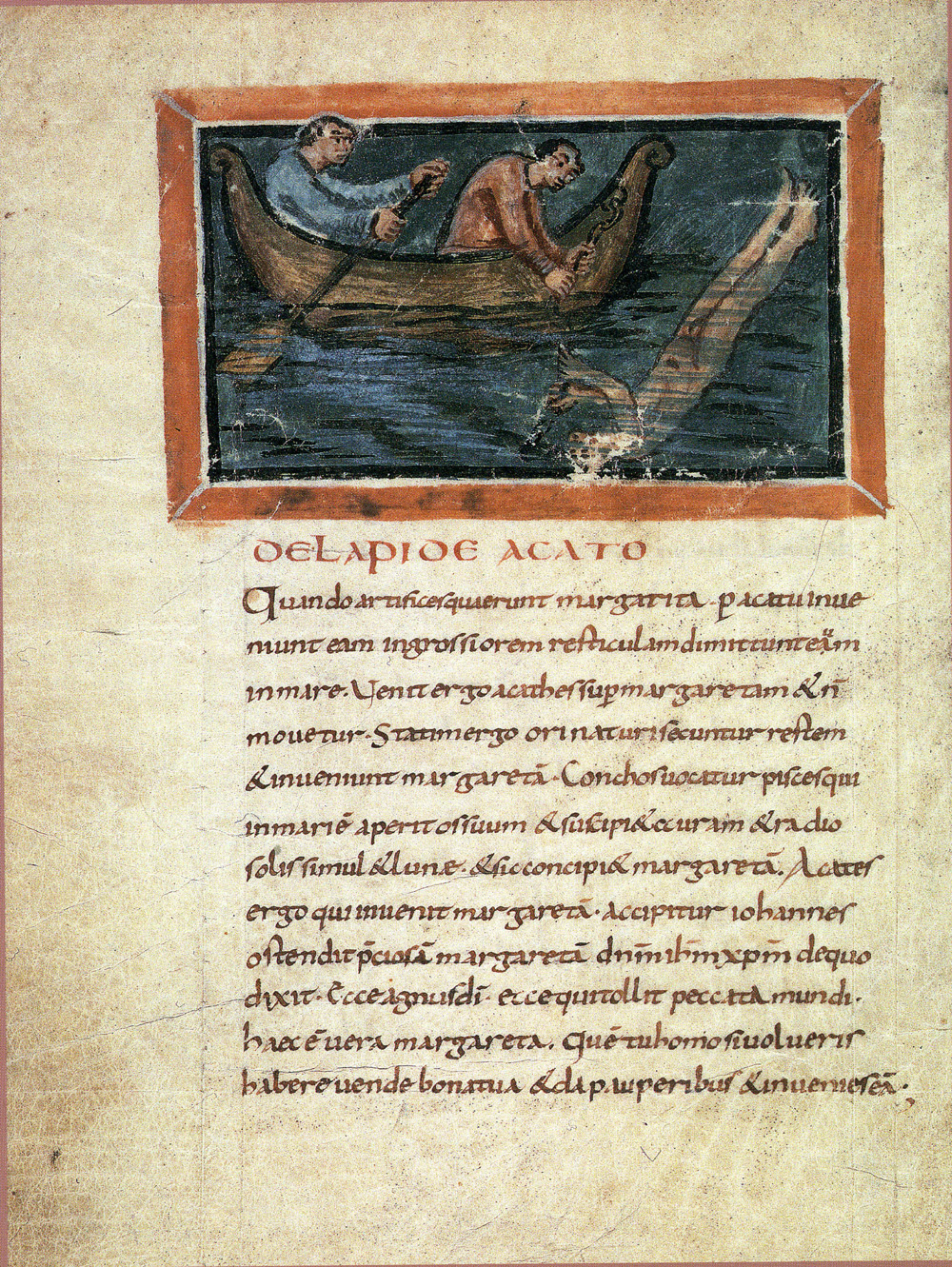
Catching of pearls, Bern Physiologus (9th century)

When Spanish conquistadors arrived in the Western Hemisphere, they discovered that around the islands of Cubagua and Margarita, some 200 km north of the Venezuelan coast, was an extensive pearl bed (a bed of pearl oysters). One discovered and named pearl, La Peregrina pearl, was offered to Philip II of Spain who intended to give it as a gift for his daughter on the occasion of her marriage, but the King found it so beautiful that he kept it for himself. Later, he elevated it to be part of the Spanish Crown Jewels. From then on, the pearl was recorded in every royal inventory for more than 200 years. According to Garcilasso de la Vega, who says that he saw La Peregrina at Seville in 1607, this was found at Panama in 1560 by a slave worker who was rewarded with his liberty and his owner with the office of alcalde of Panama.

Before the beginning of the 20th century, pearl hunting was the most common way of harvesting pearls. Divers manually pulled oysters from ocean floors and river bottoms and checked them individually for pearls. Not all mussels and oysters produce pearls. In a haul of three tons, only three or four oysters will produce perfect pearls.

Freshwater mussel shells obtained from rivers and other freshwater sources have also been used in the manufacture of pearl and pearl buttons. In India, Mehsi is known for its traditional pearl button industry and is recognized as the country's only major pearl button manufacturing cluster. The industry uses freshwater shells as raw material and supplies pearl buttons to domestic as well as international markets. Mehsi-made pearl and pearl buttons have gained recognition in countries including Japan and several European nations.

Margarita pearls are extremely difficult to find today and are known for their unique yellowish color.

==== British Isles ====
Pearls were one of the attractions that drew Julius Caesar to Britain. They are, for the most part, freshwater pearls from mussels. Pearling was banned in the U.K. in 1998 due to the endangered status of river mussels. Discovery and publicity about the sale for a substantial sum of the Abernethy pearl in the River Tay had resulted in the heavy exploitation of mussel colonies during the 1970s and 80s by weekend warriors. When it was permitted, it was carried on mainly by Scottish Travellers, who found pearls varied from river to river, with the River Oykel in the Highlands being noted for the finest rose-pink pearls. There are two firms in Scotland that are licensed to sell pre-1998 freshwater pearls.

=== Pearl farming ===
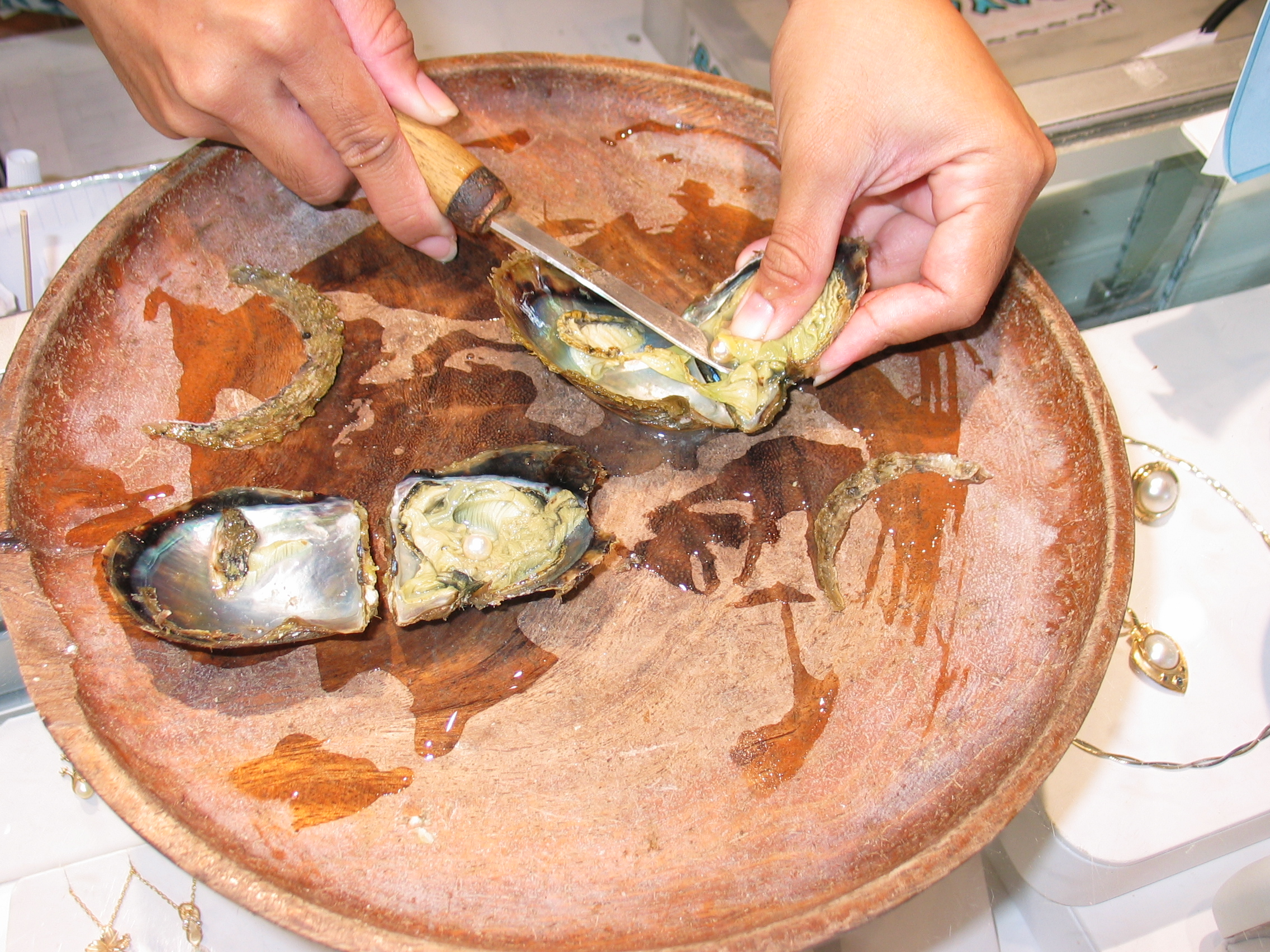
A pearl being extracted from an akoya pearl oyster

Today, the cultured pearls on the market can be divided into two categories. The first category covers the beaded cultured pearls, including akoya, South Sea, and Tahiti. These pearls are gonad grown, and usually one pearl is grown at a time. This limits the number of pearls at a harvest period. The pearls are usually harvested after one year for akoya, 2–4 years for Tahitian and South Sea, and 2–7 years for freshwater. This perliculture process was first developed by the British biologist William Saville-Kent who passed the information along to Tatsuhei Mise and Tokichi Nishikawa from Japan. The second category includes the non-beaded freshwater cultured pearls, like the Biwa or Chinese pearls. As they grow in the mantle, where up to 25 grafts can be implanted on each wing, these pearls are much more frequent and saturate the market completely. An impressive improvement in quality has taken place over ten years, with the former rice-grain-shaped pebbles largely replaced with the near-round pearls of today. More recently, large, near-perfect round bead nucleated pearls up to 15 mm in diameter have been produced with metallic luster.

The nucleus bead in a beaded cultured pearl is generally a polished sphere made from freshwater mussel shell. Along with a small piece of mantle tissue from another mollusk (donor shell) to catalyze the pearl sac, it is surgically implanted into the gonad (reproductive organ) of a saltwater mollusk. In freshwater perliculture, only the piece of tissue is used in most cases and is inserted into the fleshy mantle of the host mussel. South Sea and Tahitian pearl oysters, also known as Pinctada maxima and Pinctada margaritifera, which survive the subsequent surgery to remove the finished pearl, are often implanted with a new, larger beads as part of the same procedure and then returned to the water for another 2–3 years of growth.

Despite the common misperception, Mikimoto did not invent pearl culture. The accepted process of pearl culture was developed by the British biologist William Saville-Kent in Australia and brought to Japan by Tokichi Nishikawa and Tatsuhei Mise. Nishikawa was granted the patent in 1916 and married the daughter of Mikimoto. Mikimoto was able to use Nishikawa's technology. After the patent was granted in 1916, the technology was immediately commercially applied to akoya pearl oysters in Japan in 1916. Mise's brother was the first to produce a commercial crop of pearls in the akoya oyster. Mitsubishi's Baron Iwasaki immediately applied the technology to the South Sea pearl oyster in 1917 in the Philippines and later in Buton and Palau. Mitsubishi was the first to produce a cultured South Sea pearl – although it was not until 1928 that the first small commercial crop of pearls was successfully produced.

The original Japanese cultured pearls, known as akoya pearls, are produced by a species of small pearl oyster, Pinctada fucata martensii, which is no bigger than 6 to 8 cm (2.4 to 3.1 in) in size, hence akoya pearls larger than 10 mm in diameter are extremely rare and highly priced. Today, a hybrid mollusk is used in both Japan and China in the production of akoya pearls.

Cultured Pearls were sold in cans for the export market. These were packed in Japan by the I.C.P. Canning Factory (International Pearl Company L.T.D.) in Nagasaki Pref. Japan.

== Timeline of pearl production ==
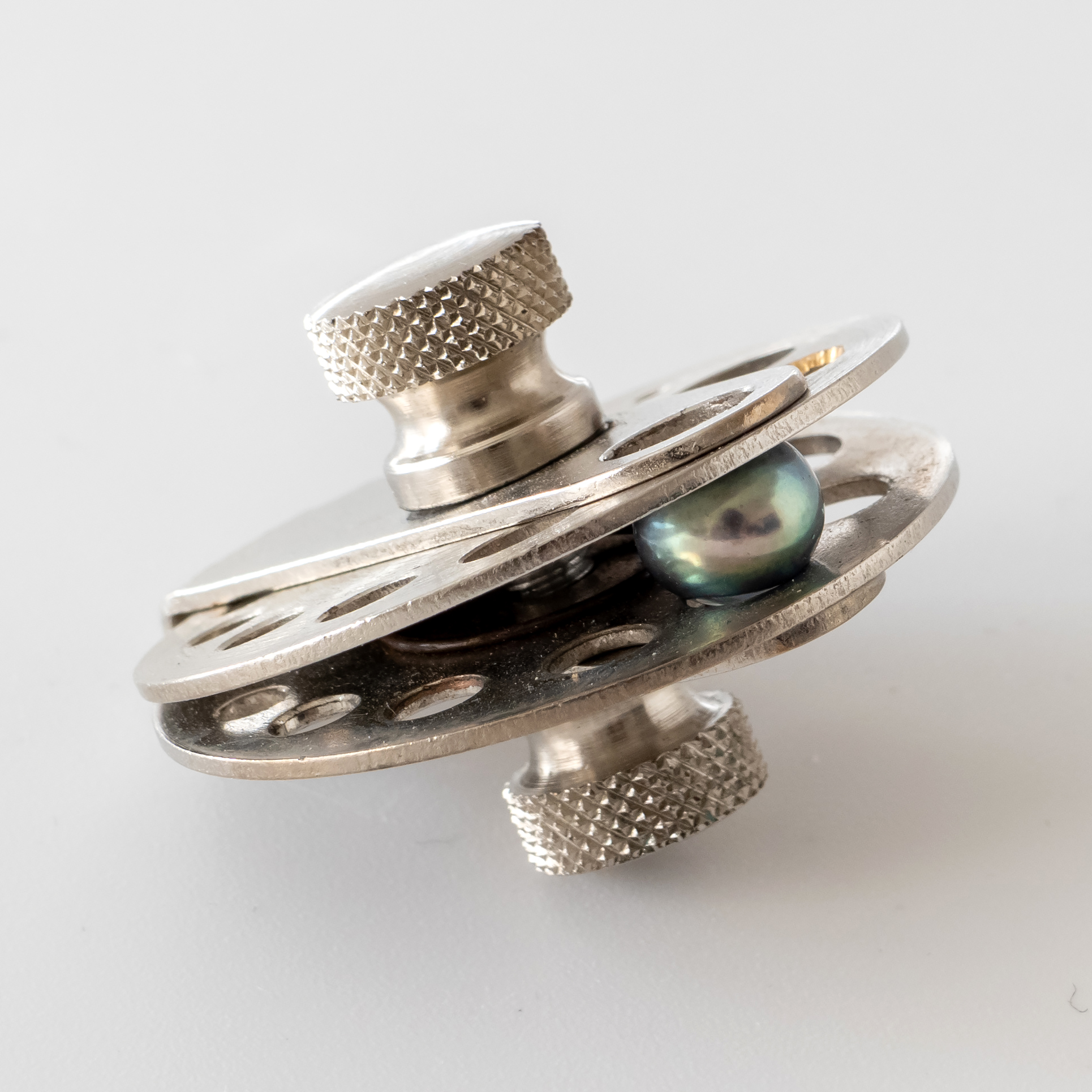
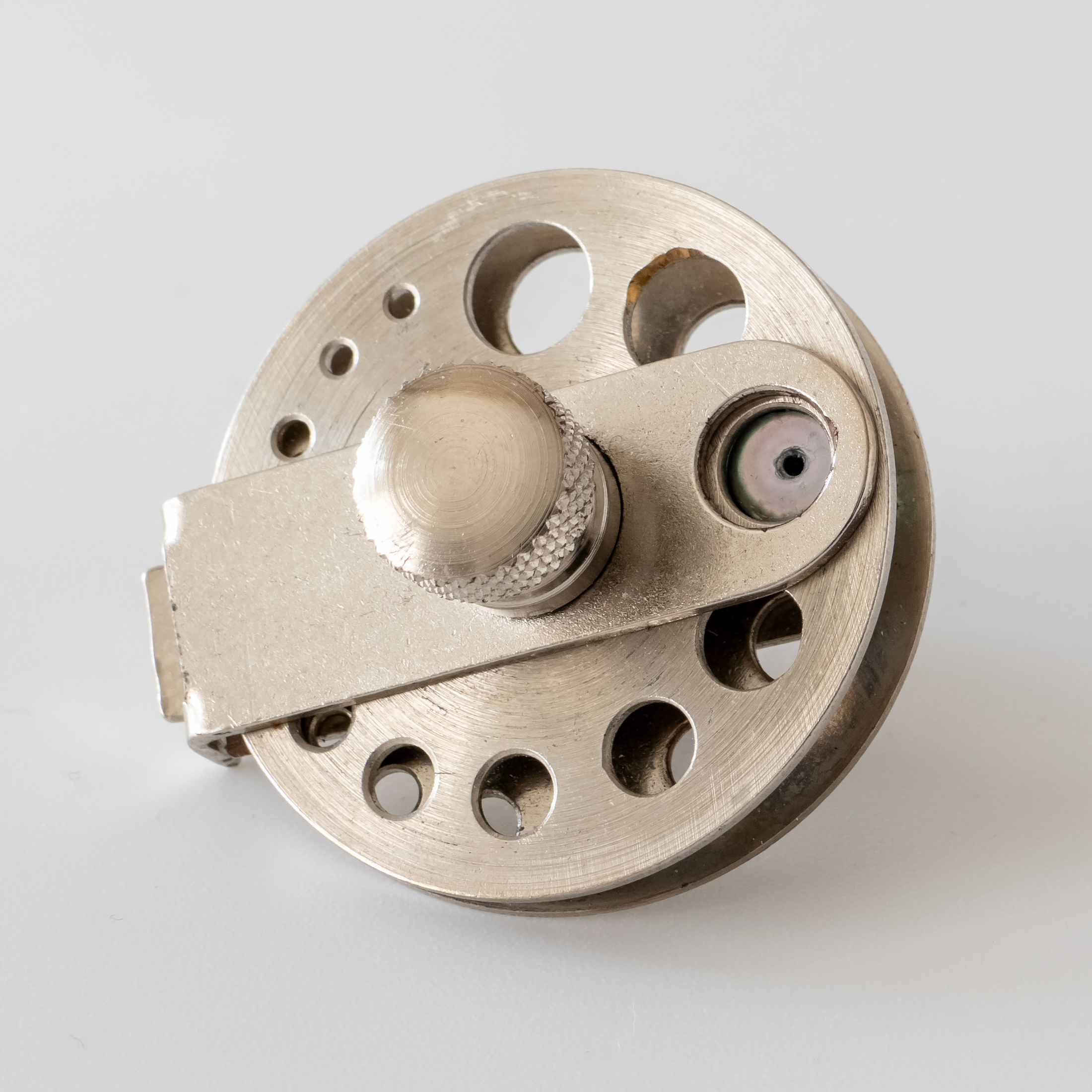
Pearl drilling clamp, a jewelry tool, for pearls of different sizes. A peacock-colored pearl is held in it and drilled.

Mitsubishi commenced pearl culture with the South Sea pearl oyster in 1916, as soon as the technology patent was commercialized. By 1931, this project was showing signs of success, but was upset by the death of Tatsuhei Mise. Although the project was recommenced after Tatsuhei's death, it was discontinued at the beginning of WWII before significant productions of pearls were achieved.

After WWII, new South Sea pearl projects were commenced in the early 1950s at Kuri Bay and Port Essington in Australia, and Burma. Japanese companies were involved in all projects using technicians from the original Mitsubishi South Sea pre-war projects. Kuri Bay is now the location of one of the largest and most well-known pearl farms owned by Paspaley, the biggest producer of South Sea pearls in the world.

In 2010, China overtook Japan in akoya pearl production. Japan has all but ceased its production of akoya pearls smaller than 8 mm. Japan maintains its status as a pearl processing center, however, and imports the majority of Chinese akoya pearl production. These pearls are then processed (often simply matched and sorted), relabeled as products of Japan, and exported.

In the past two decades, cultured pearls have been produced using larger oysters in the south Pacific and Indian Ocean. The largest pearl oyster is the Pinctada maxima, which is roughly the size of a dinner plate. South Sea pearls are characterized by their large size and warm luster. Sizes up to 14 mm in diameter are not uncommon. In 2013, Indonesia Pearl supplied 43 percent of South Sea Pearls international market. The other significant producers are Australia, Philippines, Myanmar and Malaysia.

== Freshwater pearl farming ==
In 1914, pearl farmers began growing cultured freshwater pearls using the pearl mussels native to Lake Biwa. This lake, the largest and most ancient in Japan, lies near the city of Kyoto. The extensive and successful use of the Biwa Pearl Mussel is reflected in the name Biwa pearls, a phrase which was at one time nearly synonymous with freshwater pearls in general. Since the time of peak production in 1971, when Biwa pearl farmers produced six tons of cultured pearls, pollution has caused the virtual extinction of the industry. Japanese pearl farmers recently cultured a hybrid pearl mussel – a cross between Biwa Pearl Mussels and a closely related species from China, Hyriopsis cumingi, in Lake Kasumigaura. This industry has also nearly ceased production due to pollution. Currently, the Belpearl company, based out of Kobe, Japan, continues to purchase the remaining Kasumiga-ura pearls.

Japanese pearl producers also invested in producing cultured pearls with freshwater mussels in the region of Shanghai, China. China has since become the world's largest producer of freshwater pearls, producing more than 1,500 metric tons per year (in addition to metric measurements, Japanese units of measurement such as the kan and momme are sometimes encountered in the pearl industry).

Led by pearl pioneer John Latendresse and his wife Chessy, the United States began farming cultured freshwater pearls in the mid-1960s. National Geographic magazine introduced the American cultured pearl as a commercial product in their August 1985 issue. The Tennessee pearl farm has emerged as a tourist destination in recent years, but commercial production of freshwater pearls has ceased.

== Momme weight ==
For many cultured pearl dealers and wholesalers, the preferred weight measure used for loose pearls and pearl strands is the momme. Momme is a weight measure used by the Japanese for centuries. Today, momme weight is still the standard unit of measure used by most pearl dealers to communicate with pearl producers and wholesalers. One momme corresponds to 1/1000 kan. Reluctant to give up tradition, the Japanese government formalized the kan measure in 1891 as being exactly 3.75 kilograms or 8.28 pounds. Hence, 1 momme = 3.75 grams or 3750 milligrams.

In the United States, during the 19th and 20th centuries, through trade with Japan in silk cloth, the momme became a unit indicating the quality of silk cloth.

Though the millimeter size range is typically the first factor in determining a cultured pearl necklace's value, the momme weight of the pearl necklace will allow the buyer to quickly determine if the necklace is properly proportioned. This is especially true when comparing the larger South Sea and Tahitian pearl necklaces.

== In jewelry ==
The value of the pearls in jewelry is determined by a combination of the luster, color, size, lack of surface flaw, and symmetry that are appropriate for the type of pearl under consideration. Among those attributes, luster is the most important differentiator of pearl quality, according to jewelers.

All factors being equal, however, the larger the pearl, the more valuable it is. Large, perfectly round pearls are rare and highly valued. Teardrop-shaped pearls are often used in pendants.

=== Gallery ===
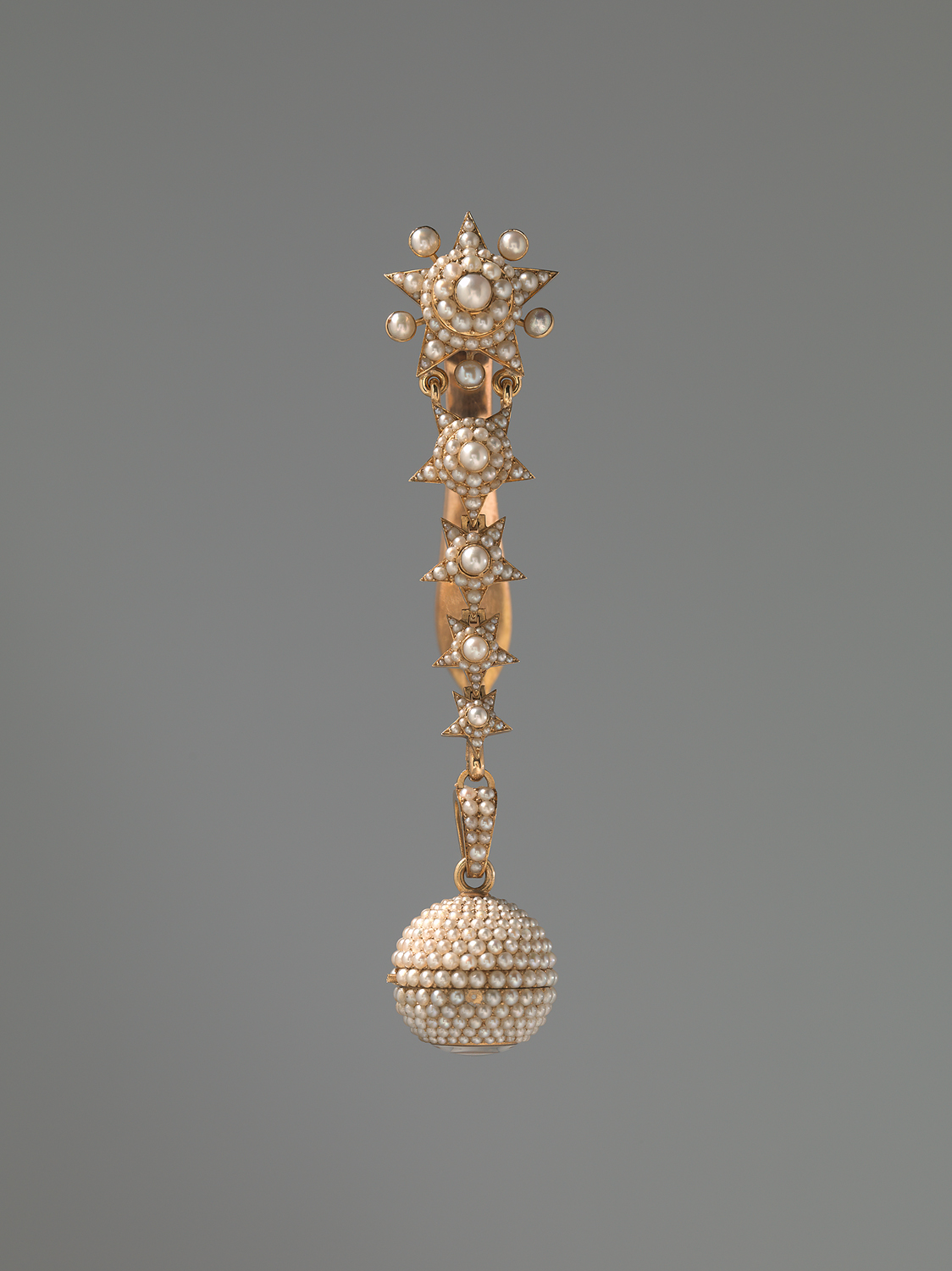
A so-called "Boule de Genève" with a matching chatelaine covered in white pearls. Amsterdam Museum

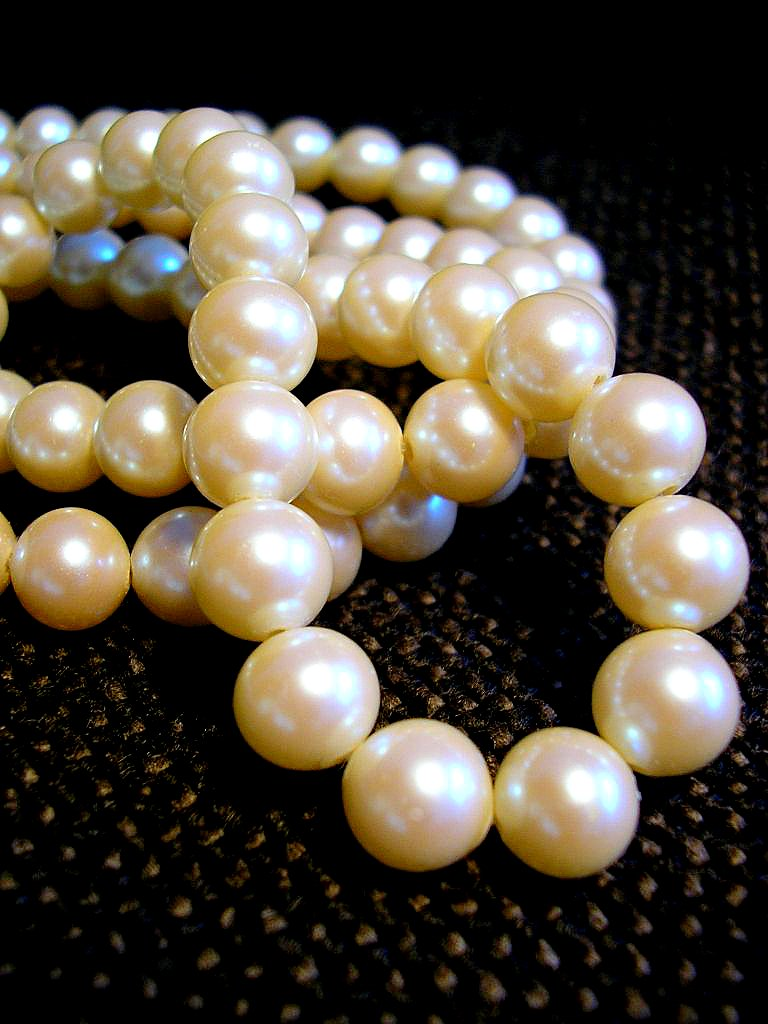
A necklace of white pearls

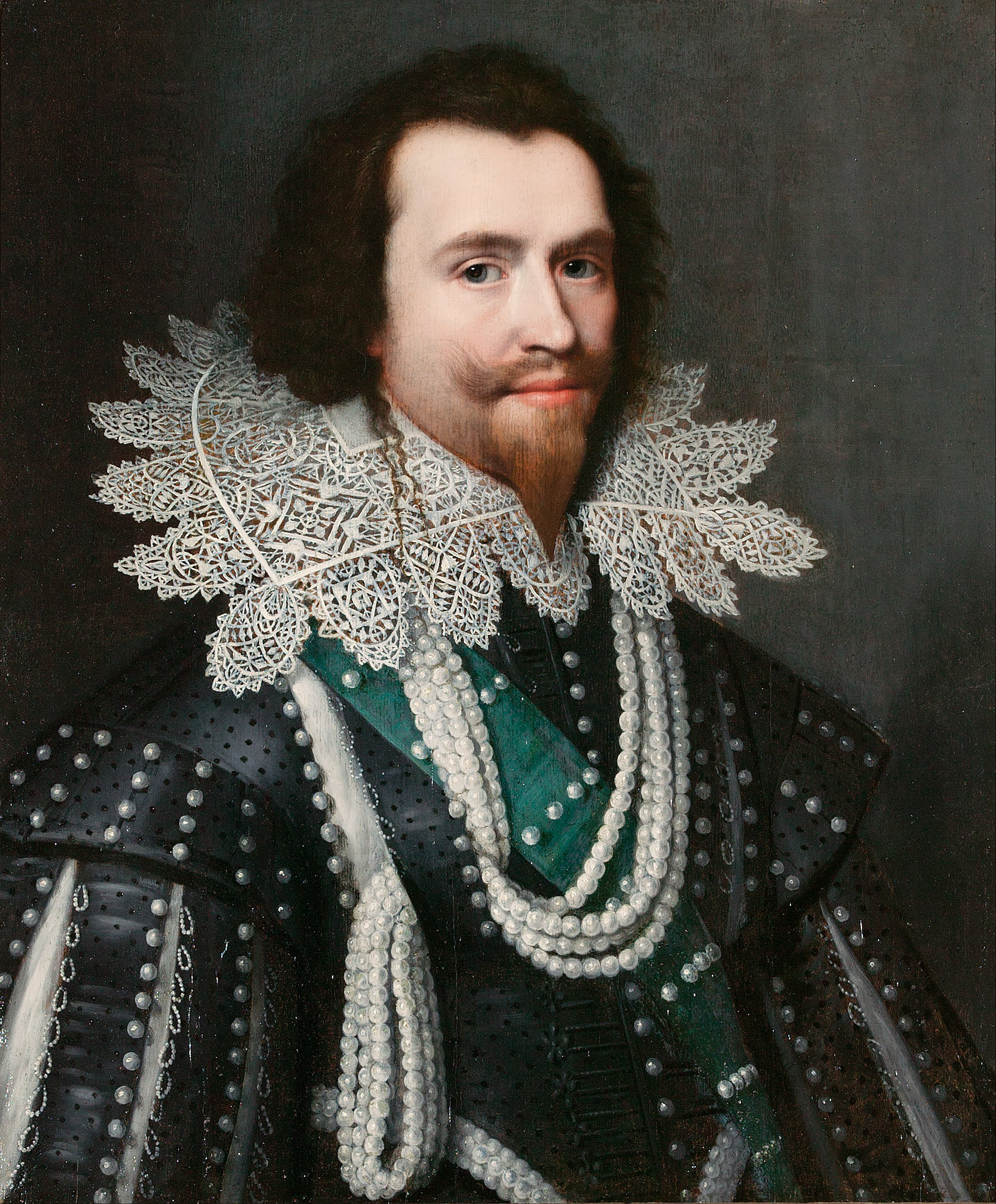
George Villiers, 1st Duke of Buckingham, wearing white pearls

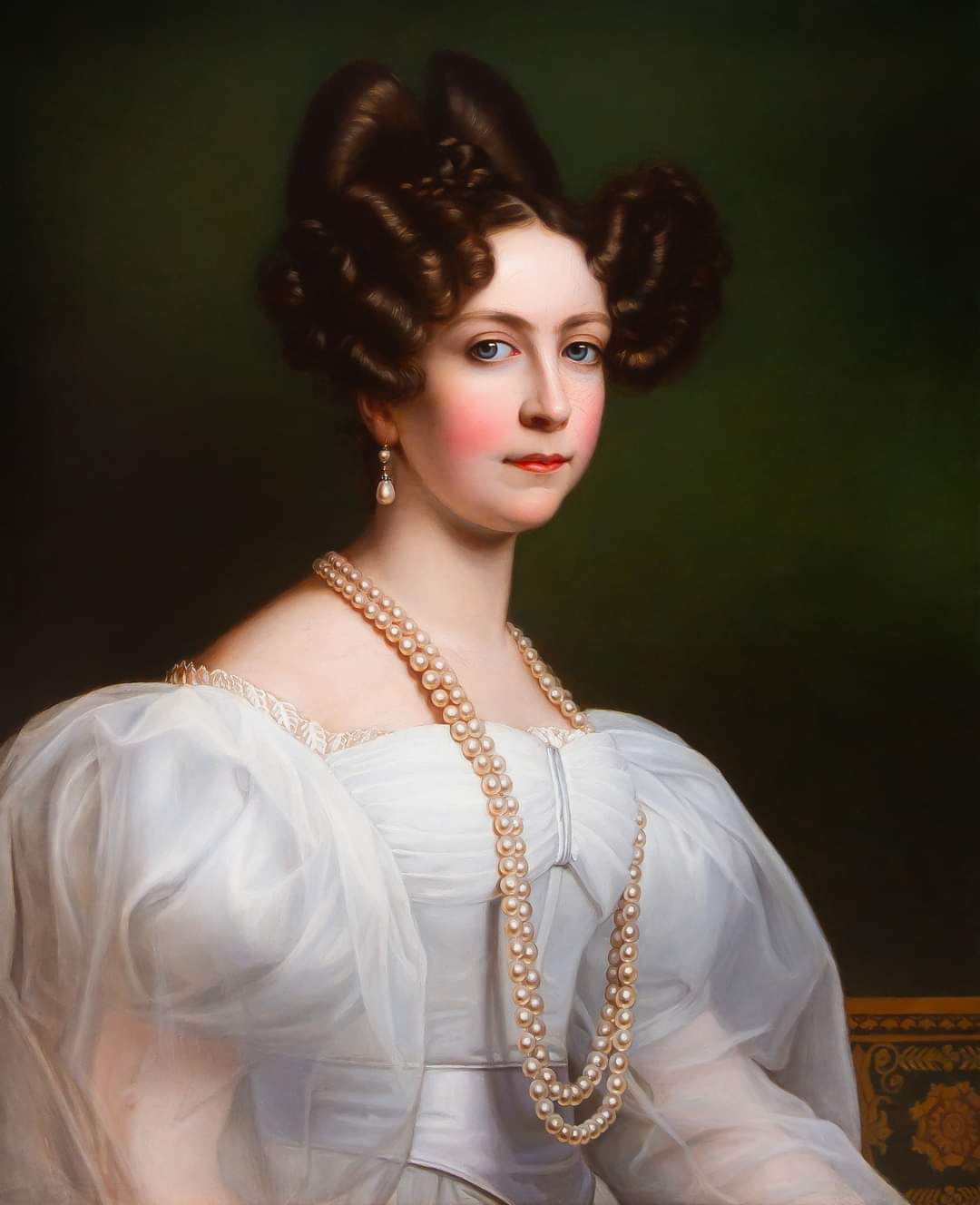
Empress Amélie of Brazil, granddaughter of Joséphine de Beauharnais (first wife of Napoleon) wearing a two-strand pearl necklace and earrings set, 1829

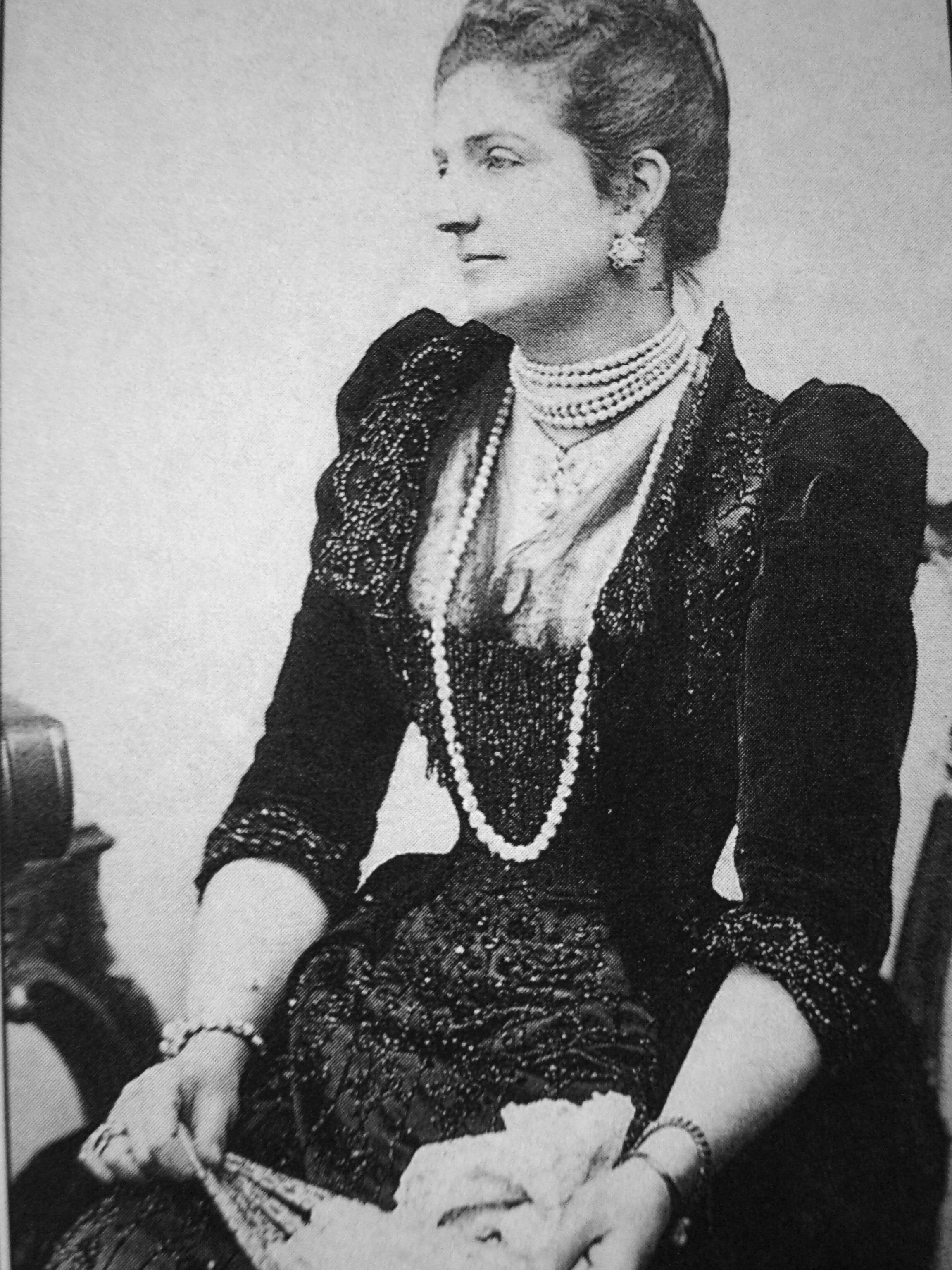
Queen of Italy, Margherita of Savoy, owned one of the most famous collections of natural pearls. She is wearing a multi-strand choker and a rope of pearls

Pearl bracelet from the 1840s

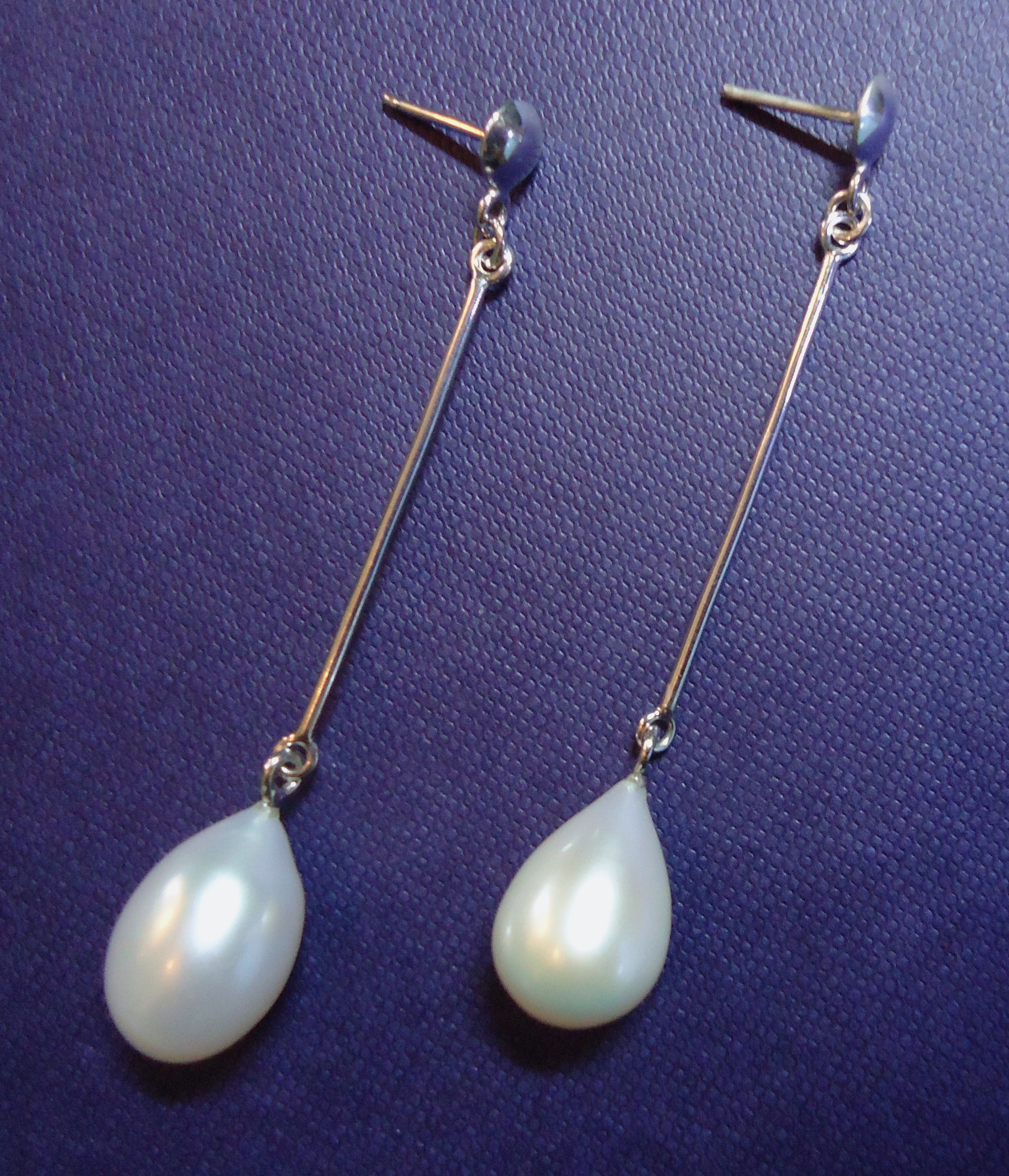
Pearl earrings

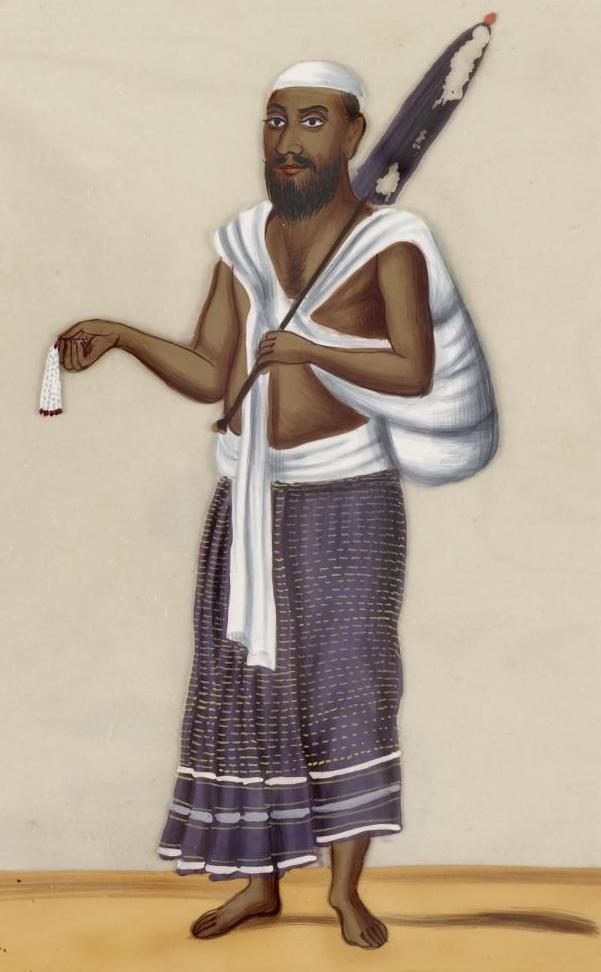
"Pearl Trader" painting on mica in 1870 India

=== Shapes ===
Pearls are generally of spherical shapes. Perfectly round pearls are the rarest and most valuable shape. Semi-rounds are also used in necklaces or in pieces where the shape of the pearl can be disguised to look like it is a perfectly round pearl. Button pearls are like slightly flattened round pearls and can also make a necklace, but are more often used in single pendants or earrings where the back half of the pearl is covered, making it look like a larger, rounder pearl.

Pear-shaped pearls sometimes look like teardrop pearls and are most often seen in earrings, pendants, or as a center pearl in a necklace. Baroque pearls have a different appeal; they are often highly irregular with unique and interesting shapes. They are also commonly seen in necklaces. Circled pearls are characterized by concentric ridges, or rings, around the body of the pearl.

In general, cultured pearls are less valuable than natural pearls, whereas imitation pearls have almost no value. One way that jewelers can determine whether a pearl is cultured or natural is to have a gem lab perform an X-ray examination of the pearl. If X-rays reveal a nucleus, the pearl is likely a bead-nucleated saltwater pearl. If no nucleus is present, but irregular and small dark inner spots indicating a cavity are visible, combined with concentric rings of organic substance, the pearl is likely a cultured freshwater. Cultured freshwater pearls can often be confused with natural pearls, which present as homogeneous pictures that continuously darken toward the surface of the pearl. Natural pearls will often show larger cavities where organic matter has dried out and decomposed.

=== Lengths of pearl necklaces ===
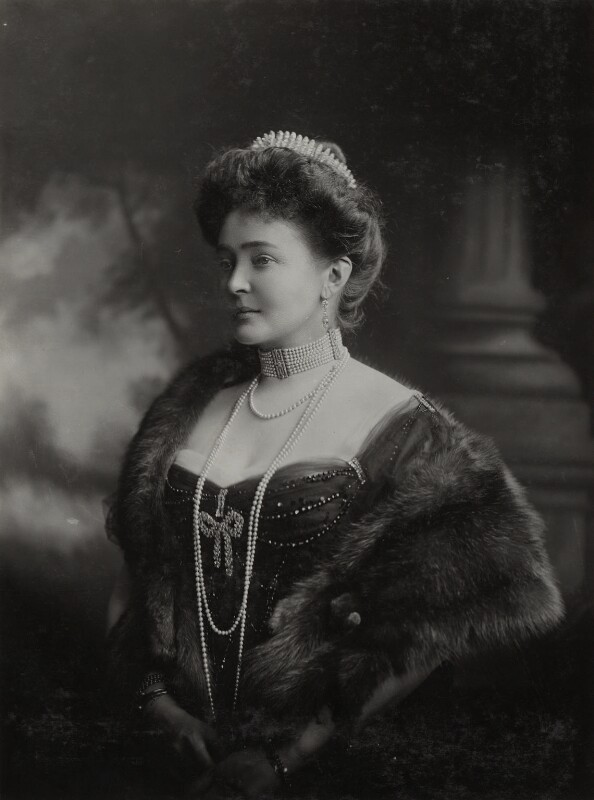
Princess Louise wearing pearls as a wide collar, a princess, an opera and a pearl rope.

There is a special vocabulary used to describe the length of pearl necklaces. While most other necklaces are simply referred to by their physical measurement, pearl necklaces are named by how low they hang when worn around the neck. A collar, measuring 10–13 in (25–33 cm) in length, sits directly against the throat and does not hang down the neck at all; collars are often made up of multiple strands of pearls. Pearl chokers, measuring 14–16 in (36–41 cm) in length, nestle just at the base of the neck. A strand called a princess length, measuring 17–19 in (43–48 cm) in length, comes down to or just below the collarbone. A matinee length, measuring 20–24 in (51–61 cm) in length, falls just above the breasts. An opera length, measuring 28–35 in (71–89 cm) in length, will be long enough to reach the breastbone or sternum of the wearer; and longer still, a pearl rope, measuring more than 45 in (110 cm) in length, is any length that falls down farther than an opera.

Necklaces can also be classified as uniform or graduated. In a uniform strand of pearls, all pearls are classified as the same size but fall in a range. A uniform strand of akoya pearls, for example, will measure within 0.5 mm. So a strand will never be 7 mm, but will be 6.5–7 mm. Freshwater pearls, Tahitian pearls, and South Sea pearls all measure to a full millimeter when considered uniform.

A graduated strand of pearls most often has at least 3 mm of differentiation from the ends to the center of the necklace. Popularized in the United States during the 1950s by the GIs bringing strands of cultured akoya pearls home from Japan, a 3.5 momme, 3 mm to 7 mm graduated strand was much more affordable than a uniform strand because most of the pearls were small.

=== Colors ===
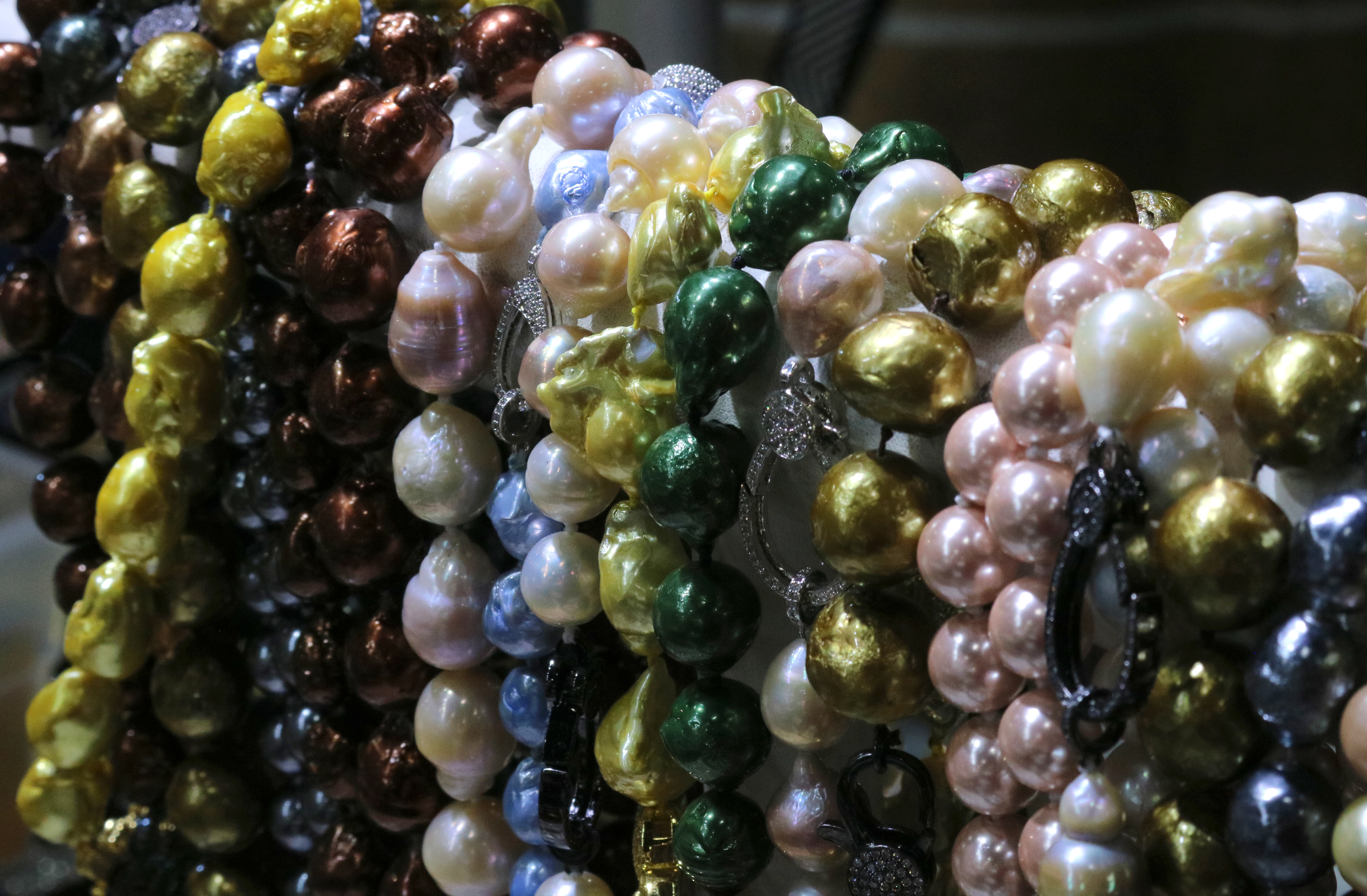
Strings of dyed baroque-shaped pearls

Earrings and necklaces can also be classified by the grade of the color of the pearl: saltwater and freshwater pearls come in many different colors. While white, and more recently black, saltwater pearls are by far the most popular, other color tints can be found on pearls from the oceans. Pink, blue, champagne, green, and even purple saltwater pearls can be encountered, but to collect enough of these rare colors to form a complete string of the same size and shade can take years.

The vast majority of inexpensive colored pearls have been subjected to some form of dye, often a fabric dye. This dye will only tend to penetrate the first layer or two of nacre, but this is enough to impart vivid and sometimes garish color to otherwise white pearls. Truly valuable pearls are never dyed, and this process is not believed to add to their market value and, in most cases, would only subtract from it.

=== Pearl buttons ===
Besides their use in jewelry, pearls and mother-of-pearl have historically been used in the manufacture of buttons. In India, the town of Mehsi, India is home to the country's only traditional pearl button manufacturing cluster. Established in the early 20th century, the industry uses freshwater oyster shells to produce pearl buttons. According to the Government of Bihar, the cluster historically comprised around 160 manufacturing units and provided direct employment to about 10,000 artisans and indirect employment to nearly 20,000 people. Mehsi-made pearl and buttons gained international recognition and were exported to Japan and several European countries.

== Religious references ==
=== Hindu scriptures ===
The Hindu tradition describes the sacred Nine Pearls, which were first documented in the Garuda Purana, one of the books of the Hindu scriptures. Ayurveda contains references to pearl powder as a stimulant of digestion and a treatment for mental ailments. According to Marco Polo, the kings of Malabar wore a necklace of 108 rubies and pearls, which was given from one generation of kings to the next. The reason was that every king had to say 108 prayers every morning and every evening. At least until the beginning of the 20th century it was a Hindu custom to present a completely new, undrilled pearl and pierce it during the wedding ceremony.

The Pearl, which can be transliterated to "Moti", a type of "Mani" from Sanskrit, is also associated with many Hindu deities, the most famous being the Kaustubha that Lord Vishnu wears on his chest.

=== Hebrew scriptures ===
The Hebrew word פְּנִינִים 'pearl(s)' appears in several places in the Hebrew Bible (Job 28:18; Proverbs 3:15; 8:11; 20:15; 31:10; Lamentations 4:7), although its etymology is unclear.

=== New Testament scriptures ===
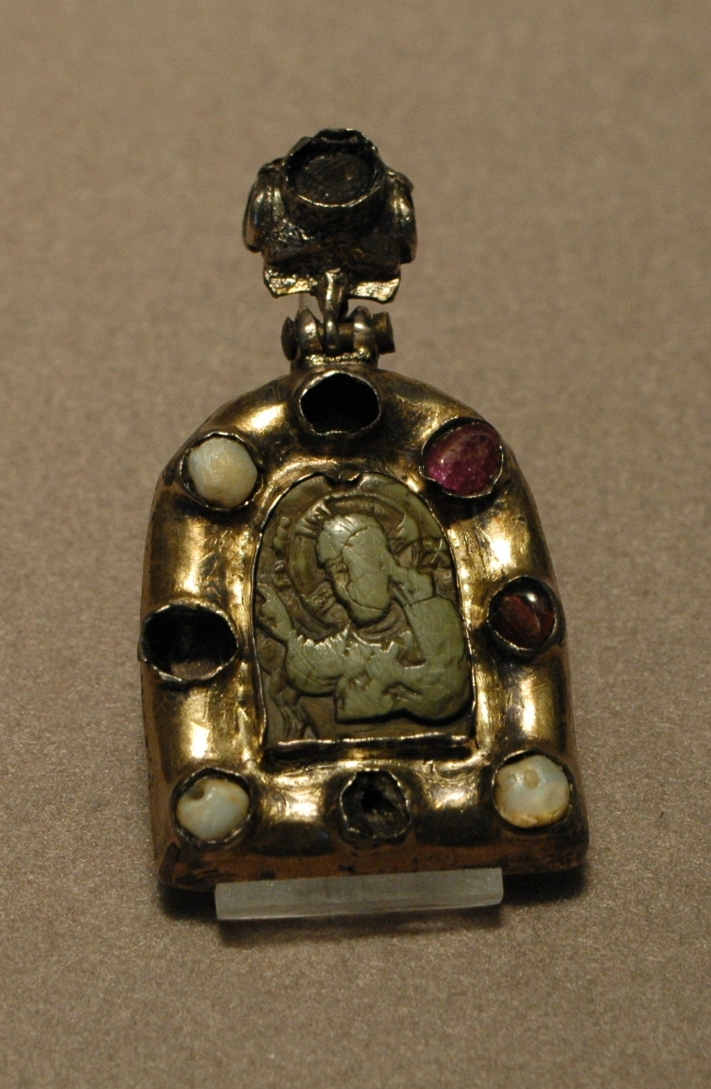
Religious pendant showing Christ blessing, framed with rubies and pearls, from the Byzantine empire, 12th or 13th century

In a Christian New Testament parable (Matthew 13:45–46), Jesus compared the Kingdom of Heaven to a "pearl of great price". "Again, the kingdom of heaven is like unto a merchant man, seeking goodly (fine) pearls: Who, when he had found one pearl of great price, went and sold all that he had, and bought it."

The twelve gates of the New Jerusalem are reportedly each made of a single pearl in Revelation 21:21, that is, the Pearly gates. "And the twelve gates were twelve pearls: every several gate was of one pearl: and the street of the city was pure gold, as it were transparent glass."

Holy things are compared to pearls in Matthew 7:6: "Give not that which is holy unto the dogs, neither cast ye your pearls before swine, lest they trample them under their feet, and turn again and rend you."

Pearls are also found in numerous references showing the wickedness and pride of a people, as in Revelation 18:16. "And saying, Alas, alas, that great city, that was clothed in fine linen, in purple, and scarlet, and decked with gold, and precious stones, and pearls!"

=== Islamic scriptures ===
The Quran often mentions that dwellers of paradise will be adorned with pearls:

22:23 "God will admit those who believe and work righteous deeds, to Gardens beneath which rivers flow: they shall be adorned therein with bracelets of gold and pearls; and their garments there will be of silk."

35:33 "Gardens of Eternity will they enter: therein will they be adorned with bracelets of gold, silver and pearls; and their garments there will be of silk."

52:24 "And they will be waited on by their youthful servants like spotless pearls."

=== Additional references ===
The metaphor of a pearl appears in the longer Hymn of the Pearl, a poem respected for its high literary quality and use of layered theological metaphor, found within one of the texts of Gnosticism.

The Pearl of Great Price is a book of scripture in the Church of Jesus Christ of Latter-day Saints (LDS Church) and some other Latter Day Saint denominations.

Pearl is a Middle English religious poem.

== See also ==
- Ammolite – another organic gemstone formed primarily of fossil aragonite mollusk shells
- Bahrain Pearling Trail, a UNESCO World Heritage Site in Muharraq, Bahrain
- Broome, Western Australia, a pearling town
- Cave pearl
- Cubagua
- Giga Pearl, largest certified pearl
- La Pelegrina pearl
- Les pêcheurs de perles, The Pearl Fishers, an opera by Georges Bizet
- Oriental Pride
- Pearl Maxima, one of the largest nacreous pearls ever found
- Pearl of Lao Tzu
- Pearl of Kuwait
- Pearl of Puerto, largest pearl in the world
- Pearl powder, used in Traditional Chinese Medicine
- The Pearl (novella), a novella by John Steinbeck
