= Makhtesh Ramon =

Erosion cirque in the Negev Desert, Israel

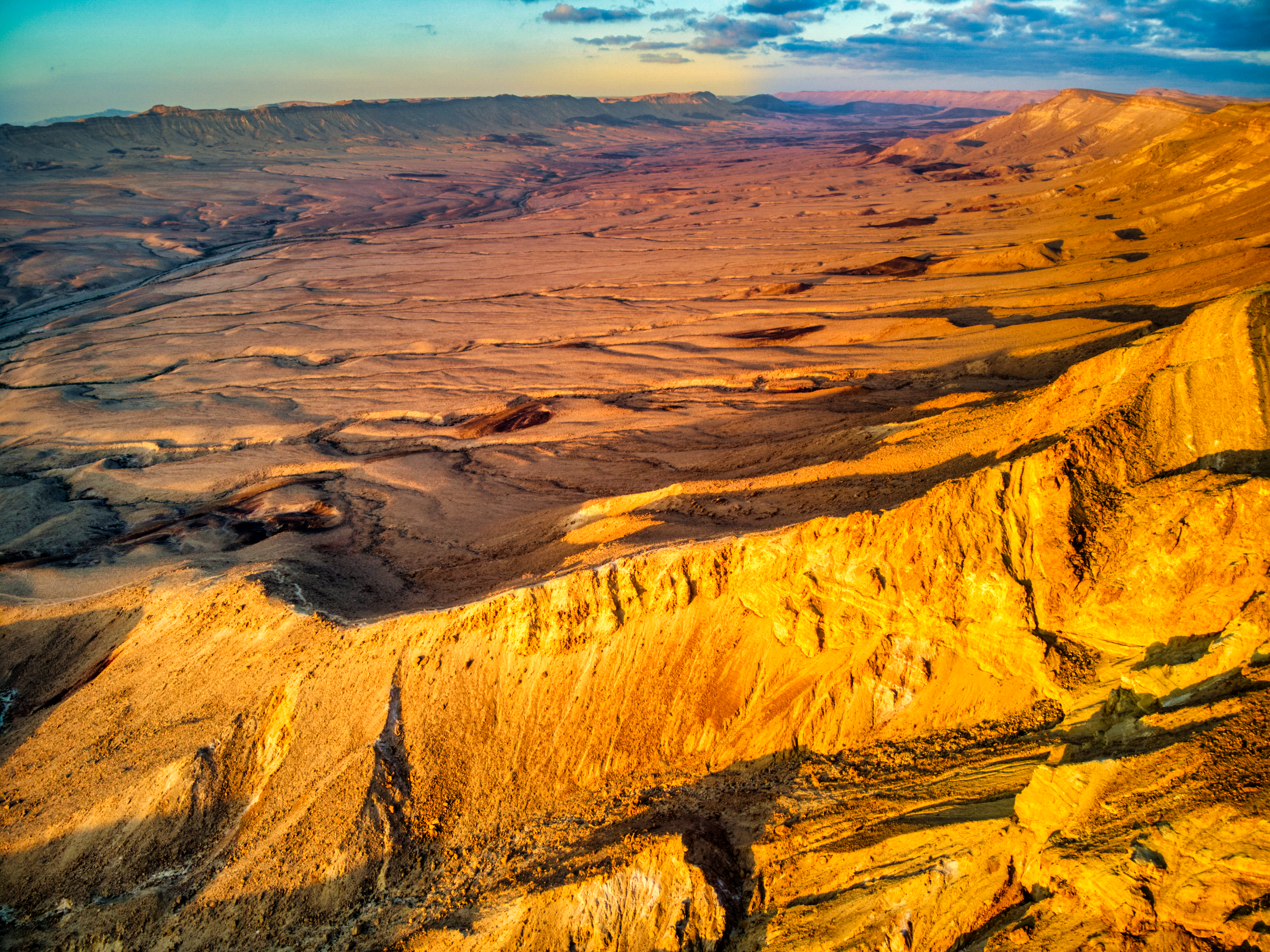
- The makhtesh is 40 km long, 2–10 km wide and 500 meters deep.

- Location within Israel
- Location: Southern, Israel
- Coordinates: 30°34′43″N 34°49′4″E
- Length: 40 km (25 mi)
- Width: 2–10 km (1.2–6.2 mi)

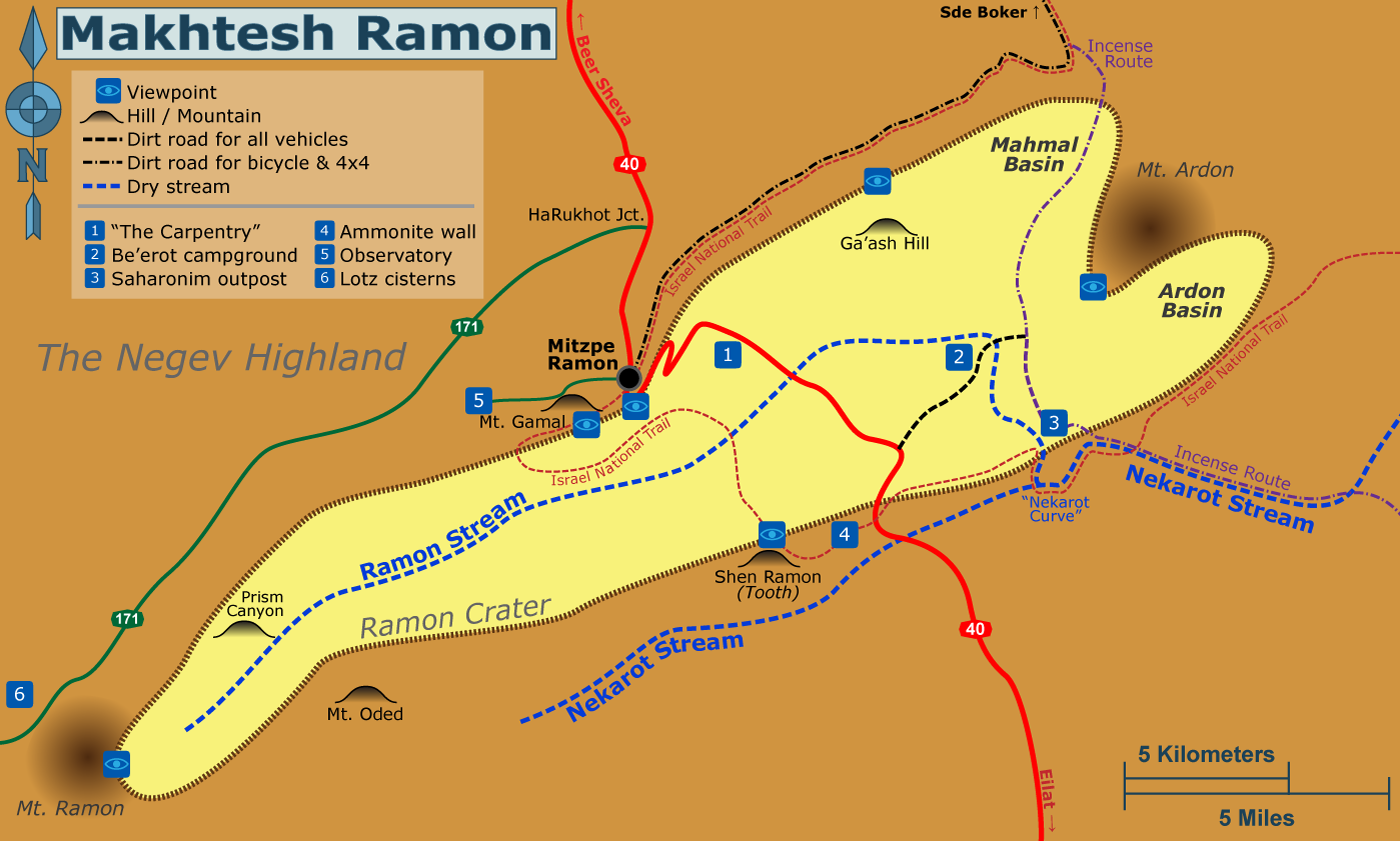
Map of Makhtesh Ramon

Makhtesh Ramon (Hebrew: מכתש רמון; lit. Ramon Crater/Makhtesh; Arabic: وادي الرمان; lit. The Ruman Wadi) is a geological feature of Israel's Negev desert. Located some 85 km south of Beersheba, the landform is the world's largest "erosion cirque" (steephead valley or box canyon). The formation is 40 km long, 2–10 km wide and 500 meters deep. Despite its appearance, it is not an impact crater from a meteor nor a volcanic crater formed by a volcanic eruption.

The only settlement in the area is the small town of Mitzpe Ramon (מצפה רמון, "Ramon Lookout") located on the northern edge of the depression. Today the area forms Israel's largest national park, the Ramon Nature Reserve.

== Formation ==
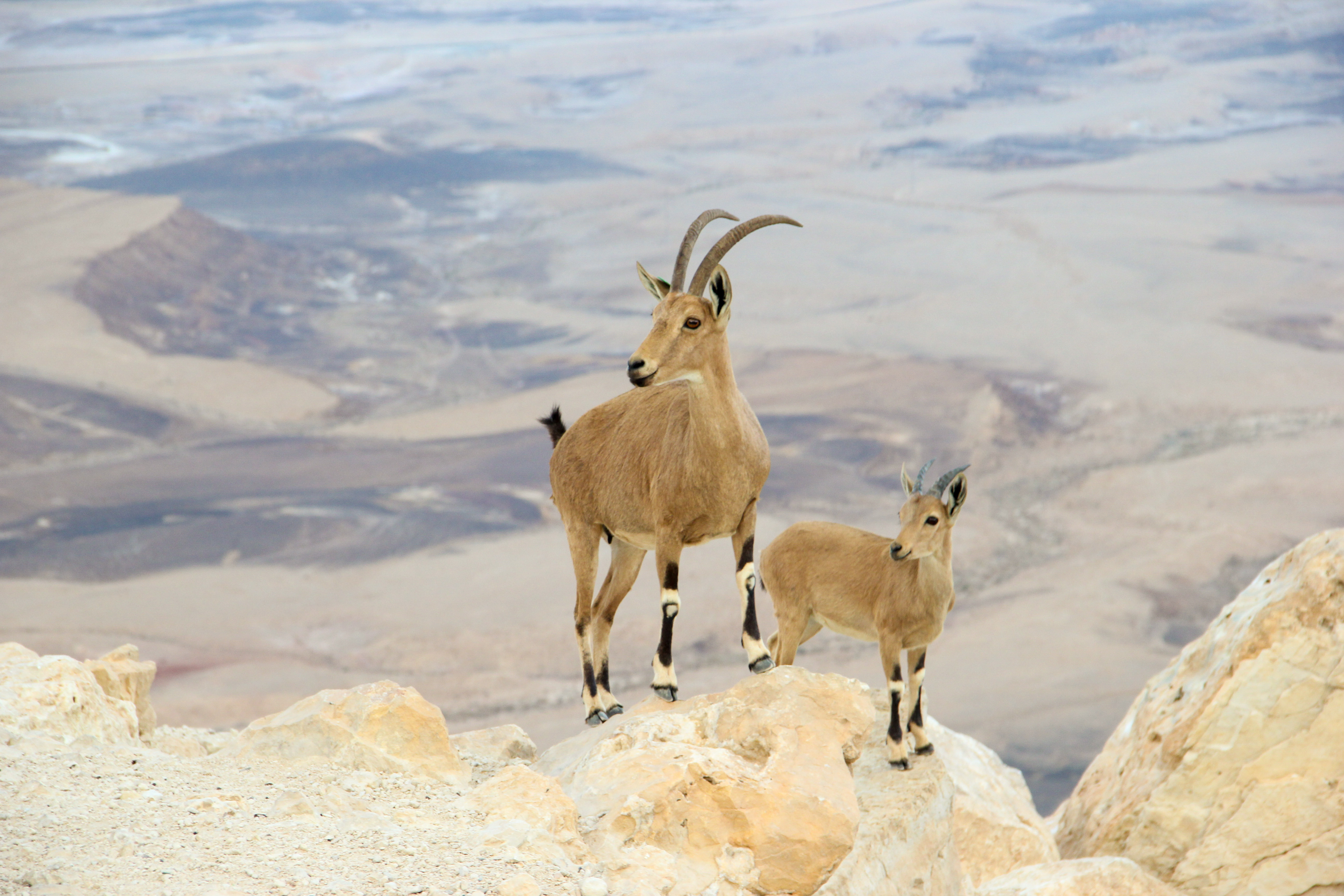
A Nubian ibex on the edges of Makhtesh Ramon

Hundreds of millions of years ago, the Negev was covered by the Tethys ocean. Slowly, it started to recede northwards, leaving behind a hump-shaped hill. The hump was slowly flattened by water and climatic forces. Approximately 5 mya, the Arava Rift Valley was formed, with rivers changing their courses, carving out the inside of the crater which was a softer rock than that overlying. The crater bottom continued to deepen at a much faster rate than the surrounding walls, which gradually increased in height. As the crater deepened, more layers of ancient rock were exposed, with rocks at the bottom of the crater being up to 200 million years old. Today, the crater is 500 metres deep, with the deepest point being Ein Saharonim (Saharonim Spring). This spring serves as the sole natural water source within the crater, supporting a significant portion of its wildlife population, including onagers and ibex.

== Geology ==
Makhtesh Ramon contains a diversity of rocks including clay hills known for their red and yellow colors and forms. Mountains rise at the borders of the crater: Har Ramon (Mt. Ramon) at the southern end, Har Ardon (Mt. Ardon) at the north-eastern end, and two table mountains—Har Marpek (Mt. Marpek - "Elbow"), and Har Katum (Mt. Katum - "Cropped")—along the southern wall. The hills to the north-eastern edge of the makhtesh were once entirely covered by spiral ammonite fossils, ranging from the size of snails to that of tractor wheels although these have mainly been extracted so only smaller fossils can be found here today.

Giv'at Ga'ash, a black hill in the north of the makhtesh, was once an active volcano which erupted thousands of years ago and caused it to be covered in lava which quickly cooled in the open air, converting it into basalt. Limestone covered by basalt can also be found in smaller black hills in the southern part of the makhtesh, including Karnei Ramon.

Shen Ramon (Ramon's Tooth) is a rock made of magma which hardened whilst underground. It later rose up through cracks in the Earth's surface, and today stands in striking contrast with the nearby creamy coloured southern wall of the crater, as a black sharp-edged rock. In the centre of the makhtesh is HaMinsara (The Prism), a low hill made up of columnar jointed sandstone—polygonal prismatic columns of quartzite. The pteriidan bivalve Family Ramonalinidae is found in early Middle Triassic rocks of Makhtesh Ramon and was named after this feature. Nahal Ardon in the east of the makhtesh contains several vertical dikes. Occasional geodes of celestine can be found next to some of them.

== Fauna ==
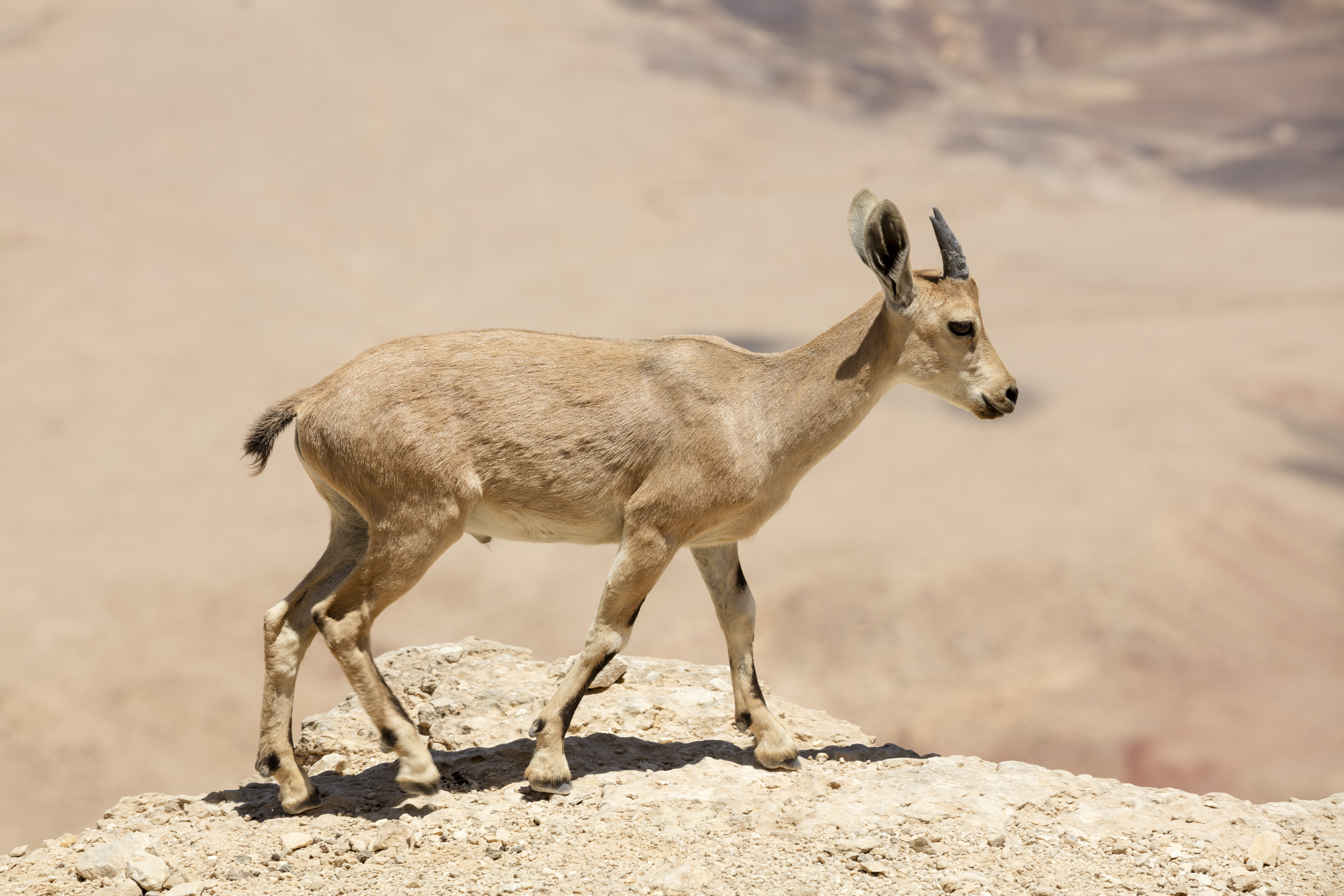
A Nubian ibex on the edges of Makhtesh Ramon

The Asiatic wild ass has been reintroduced to Makhtesh Ramon. In 1995 the population had increased to 40 adults in the area. The animals are hybrids of two subspecies of the Asian Wild Ass, derived from the Turkmenian kulan (E. h. kulan) and the Persian onager (E. h. onager). The original subspecies, the Syrian wild ass (E. h. hemippus), is extinct.

Other larger mammals of the area include Nubian ibex, Dorcas gazelles, striped hyenas, Arabian wolves, caracals, golden jackals, and reintroduced Arabian oryx. Historically, the area was home to Arabian leopards. However, they are likely extirpated in Israel.

== History ==
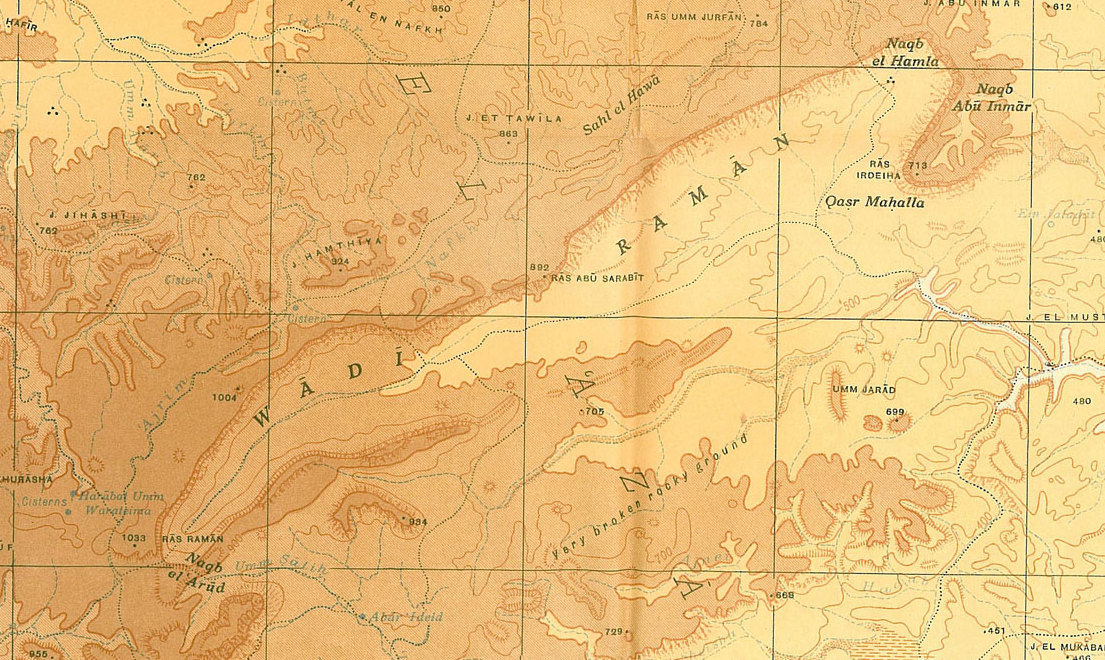
Wadi Raman in the 1944 Survey of Palestine map

The ruins of a large prehistoric stone structure known as Khan Saharonim are found in the makhtesh, as it lies along the ancient Incense Route, a trade route used by the Nabataeans 2,000 years ago. These ruins acted as a way station for the traders and their animals (khan is the Arabic word for a caravanserai) as they proceeded further westward to the Mediterranean seaport city of Gaza.

Located atop the northern cliff of the crater, one can find Metzad Mahmal, the remnants of a stronghold employed by the Nabataeans and the Romans to safeguard the Incense Route. The site was excavated by several archaeologists, and declared a World Heritage Site by UNESCO in 2005.

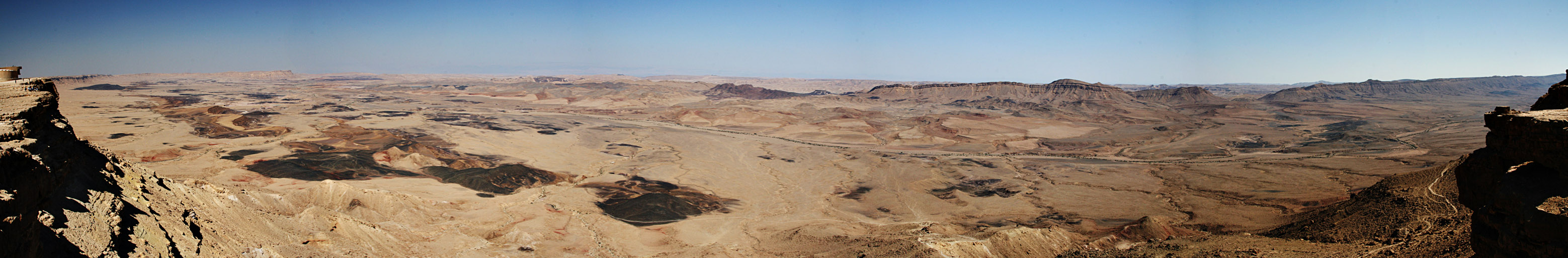
Wide panorama of the Makhtesh Ramon crater, Israel

== Gallery ==
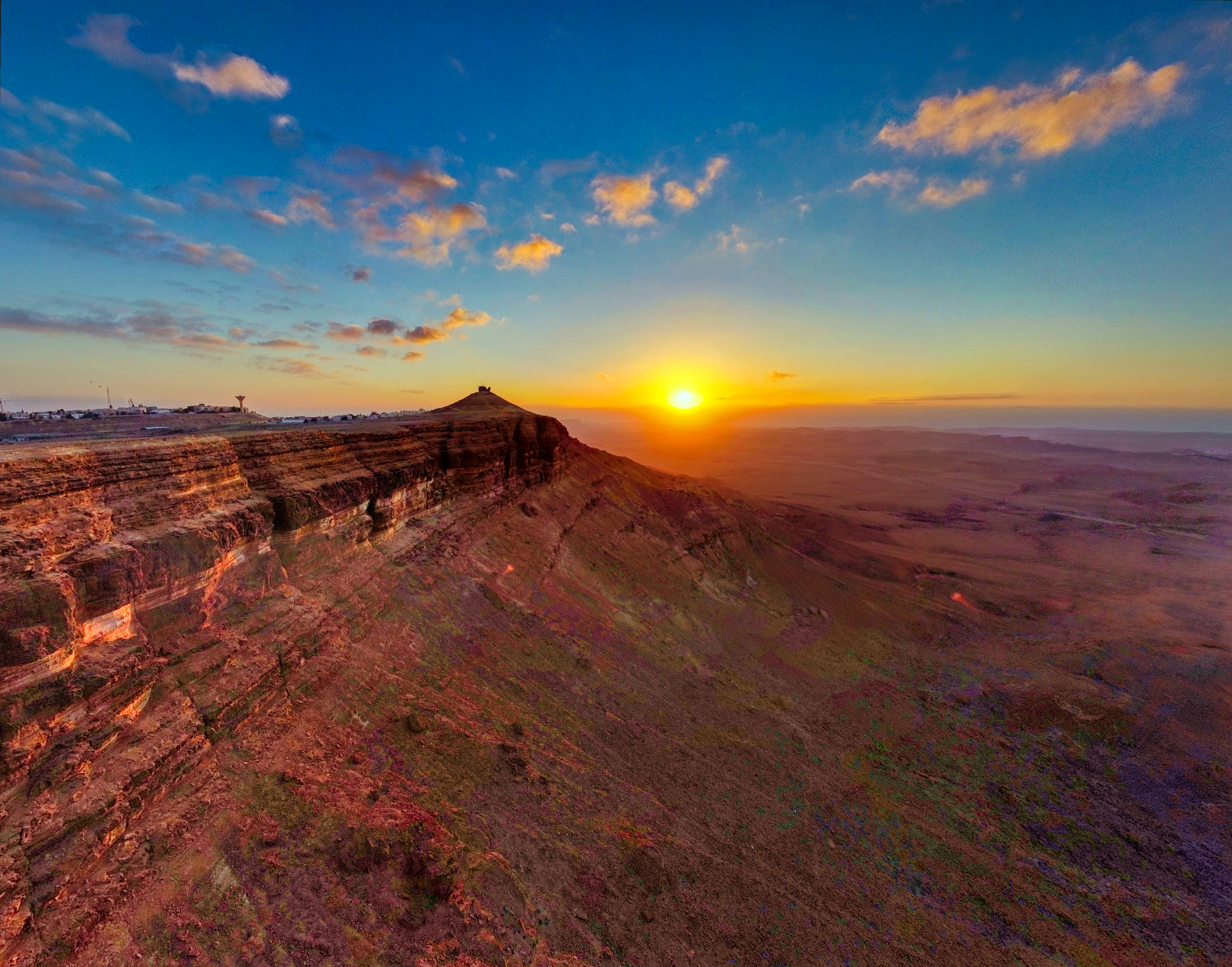
Camel Hill, Mitzpe Ramon, Makhtesh Ramon

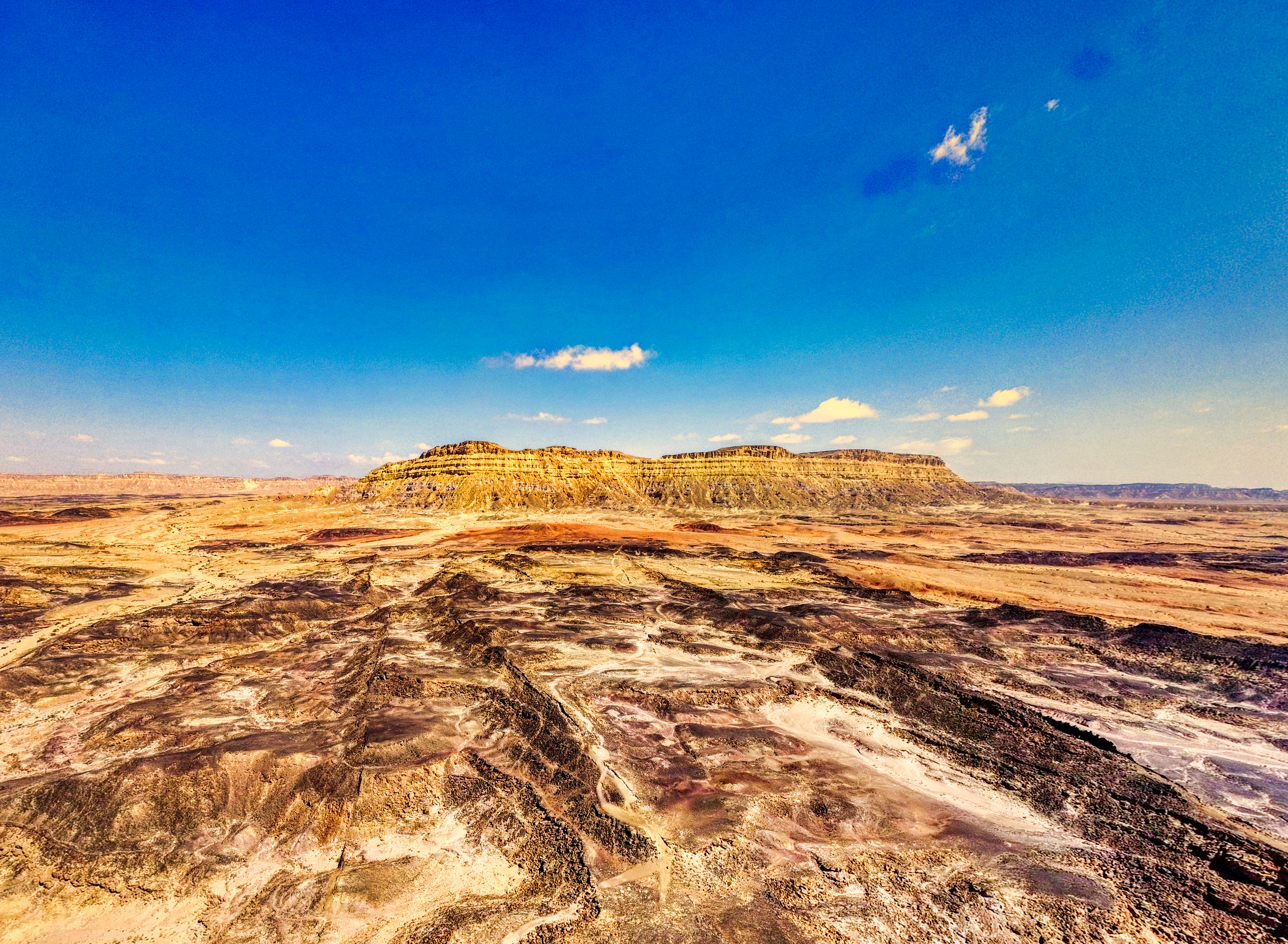
Mount Ardon

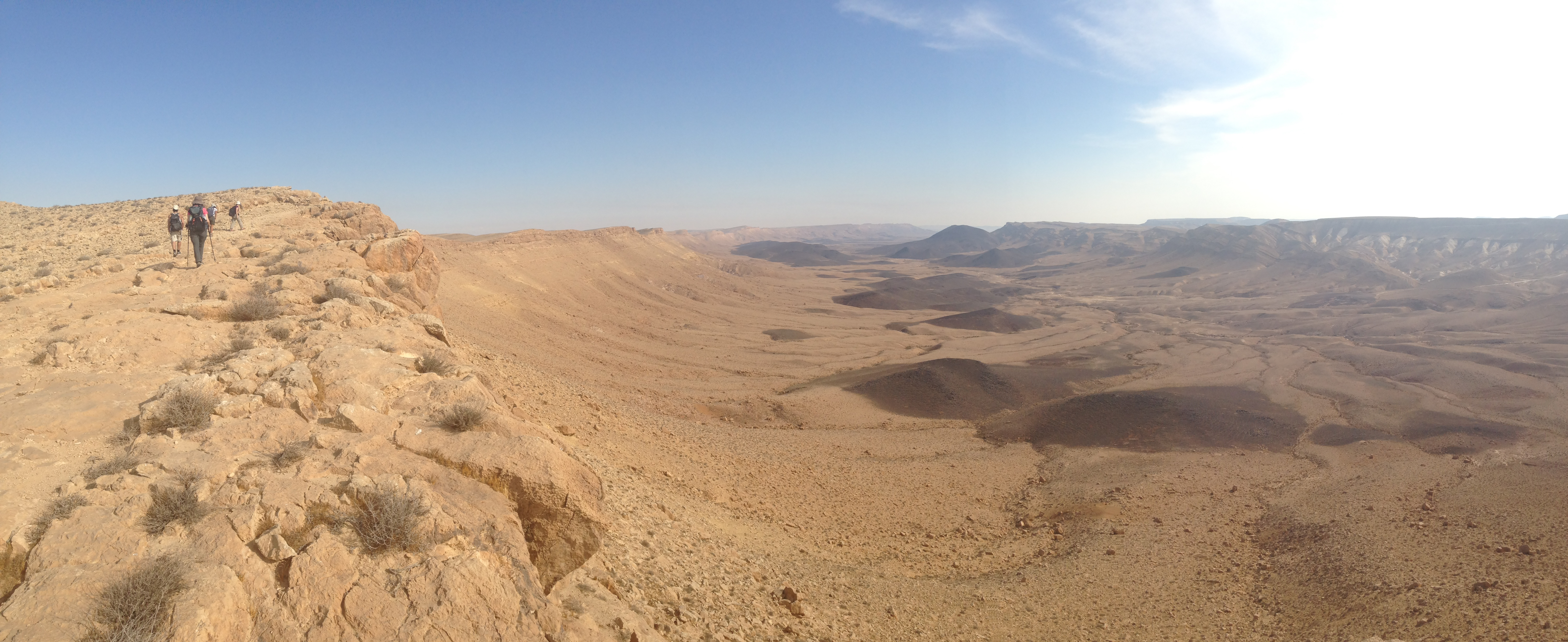
View of Makhtesh Ramon from its west

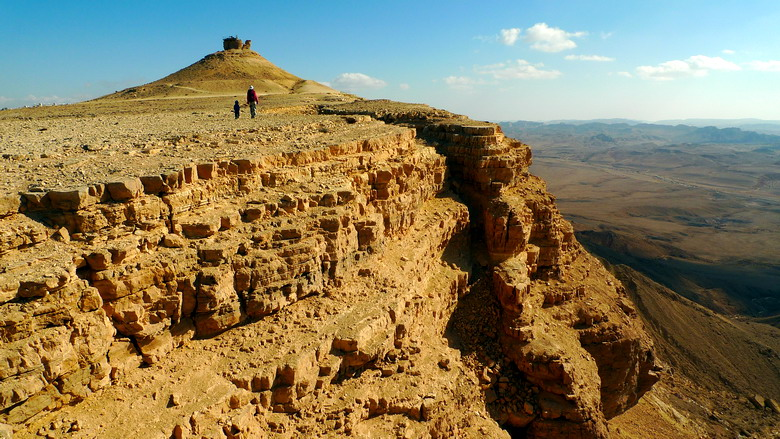
The cliff

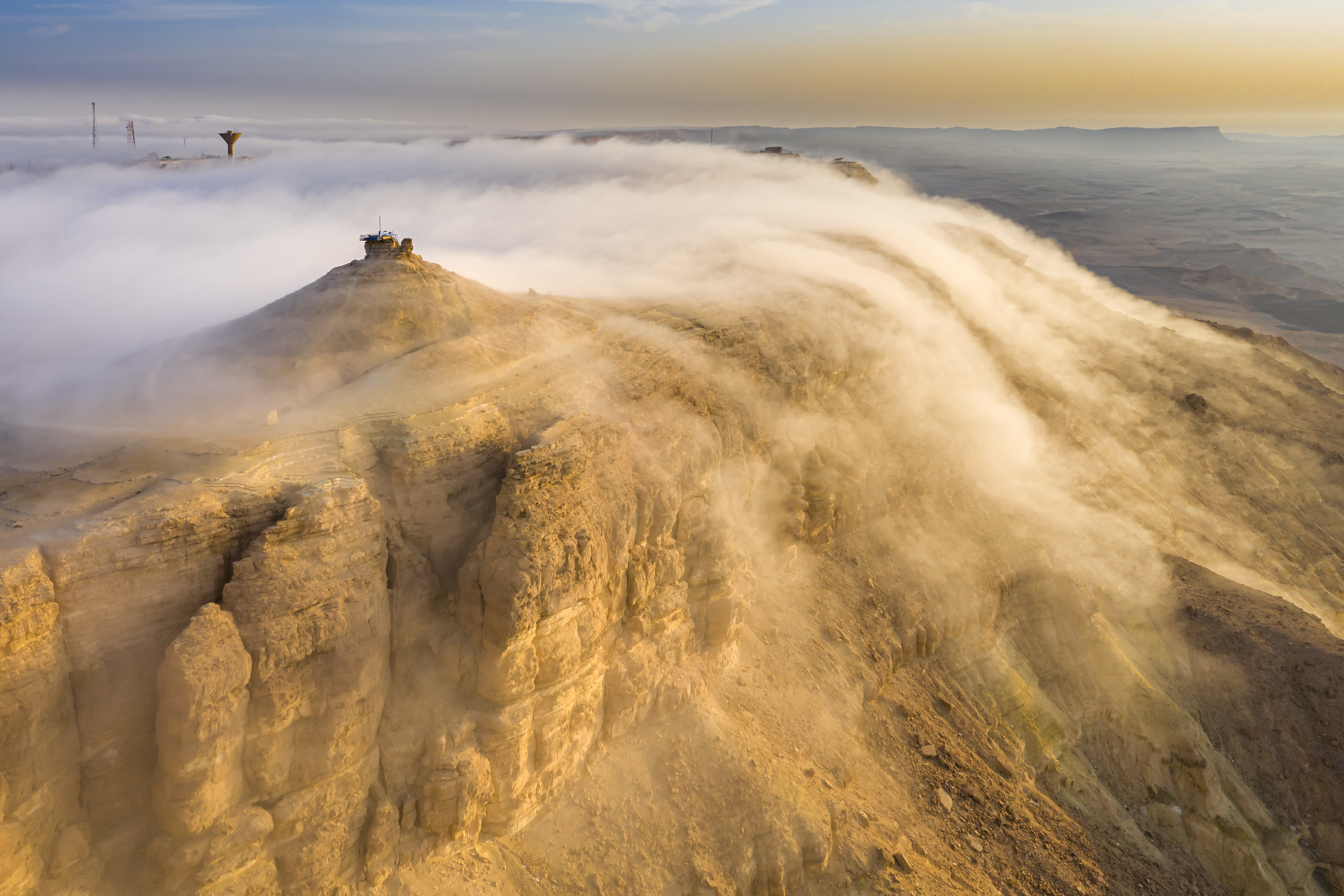
Cloud gliding (radiation fog falling in a katabatic wind) into Makhtesh Ramon

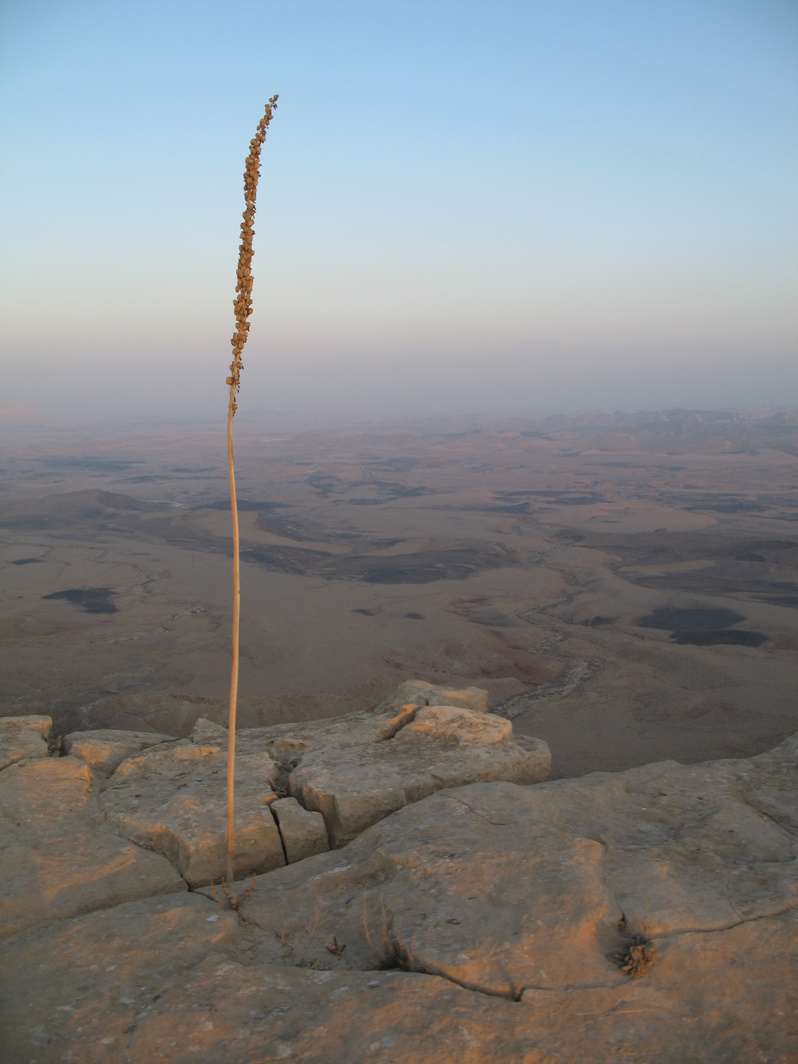
Dry Drimia maritima (Urginea maritima) at the northern edge of the makhtesh

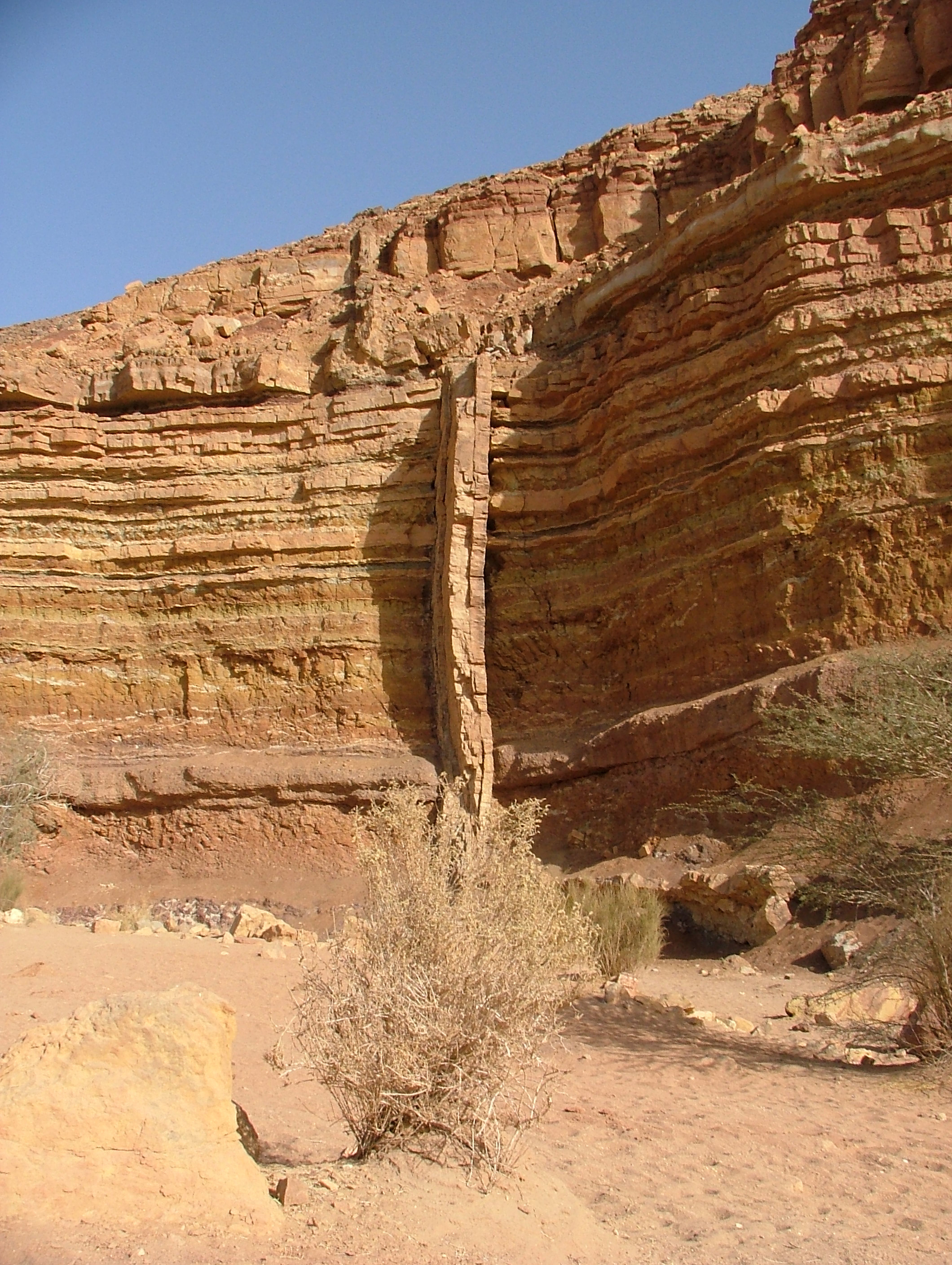
Rock formation (dike)

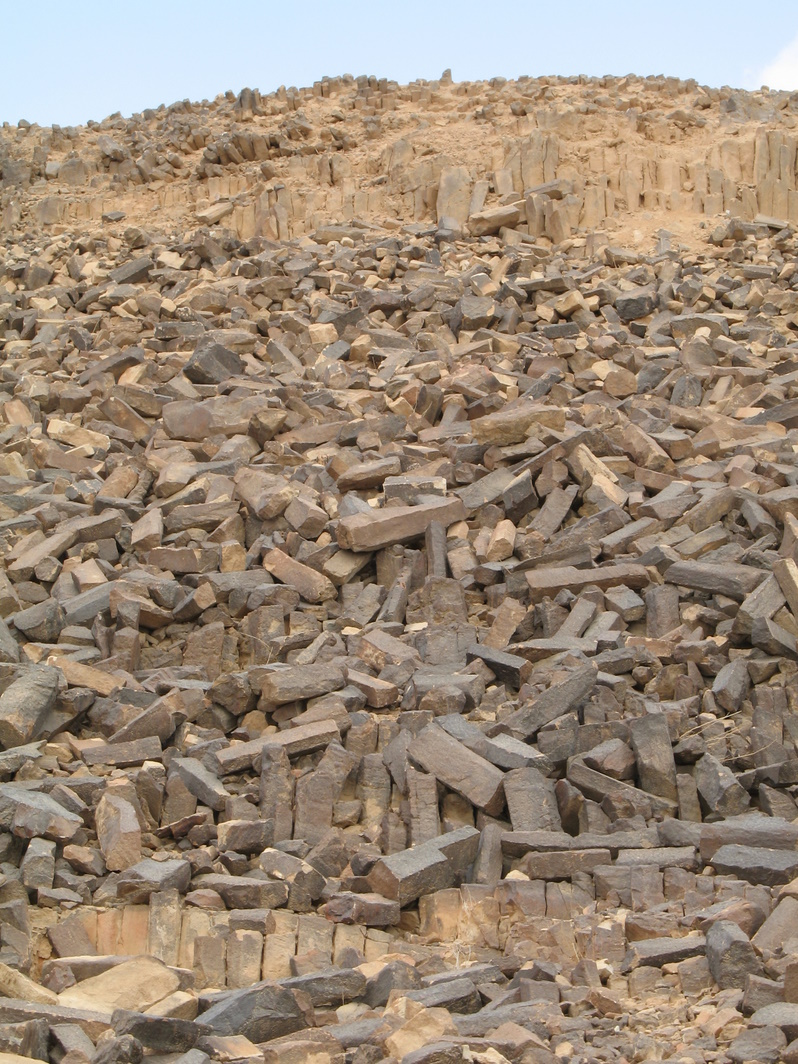
Ha-Minsara (The Sawmill): "baked" sandstone turned into hard quartzite

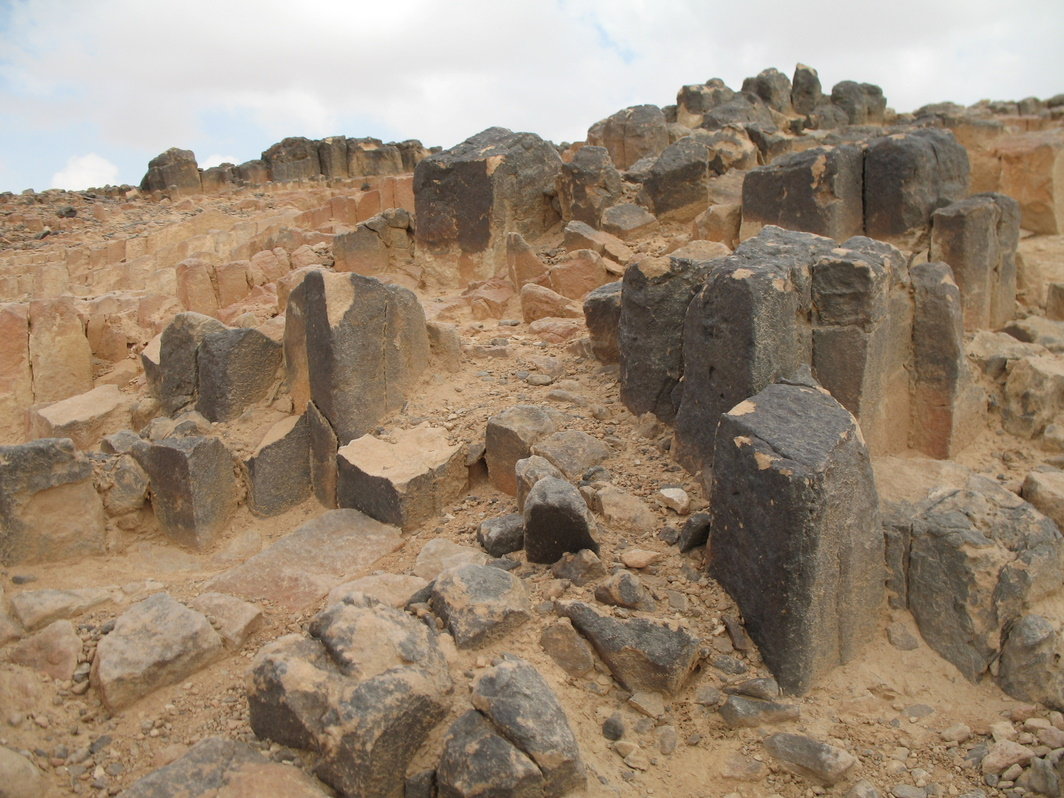
Sandy rectangular and hexagonal prisms at the centre of Makhtesh Ramon – Ha-Minsara (The Sawmill)

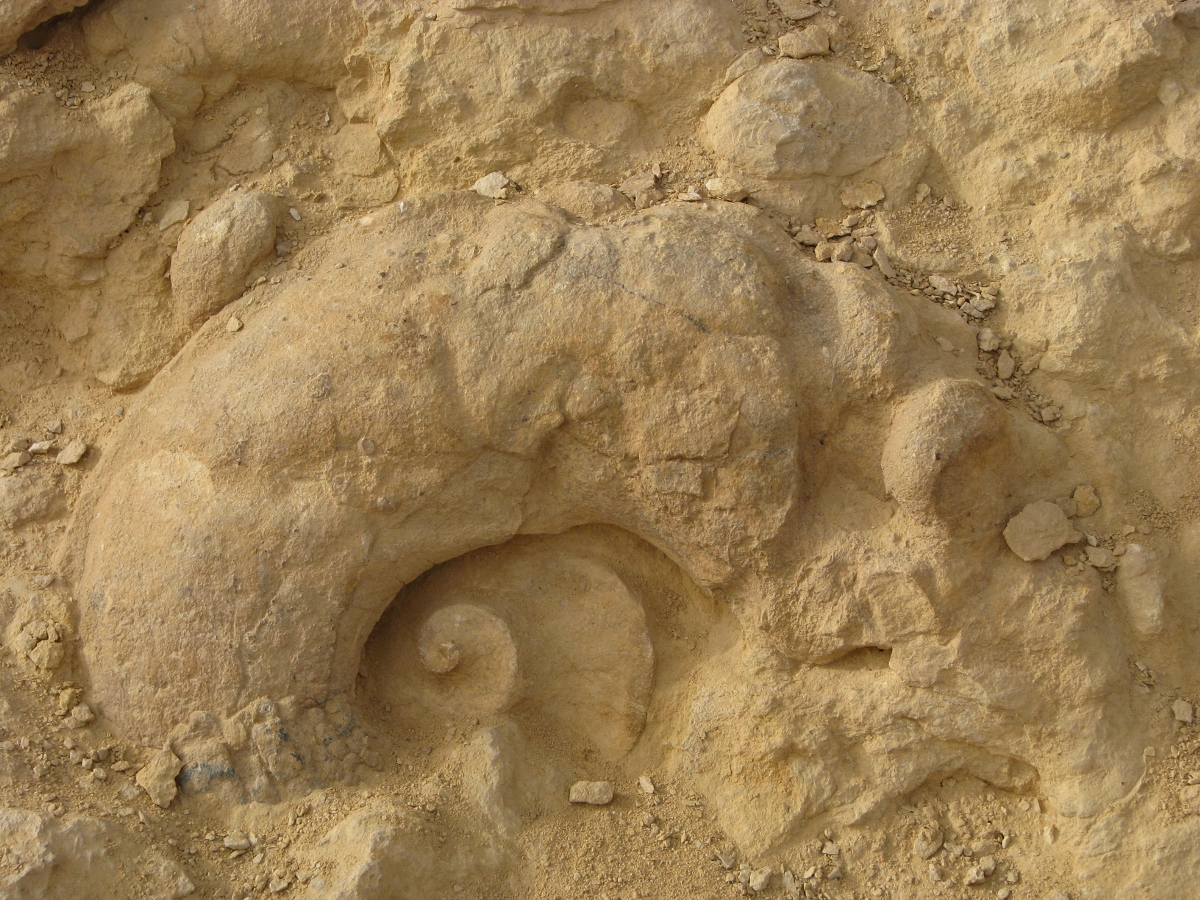
An ammonite in the Ammonite Wall

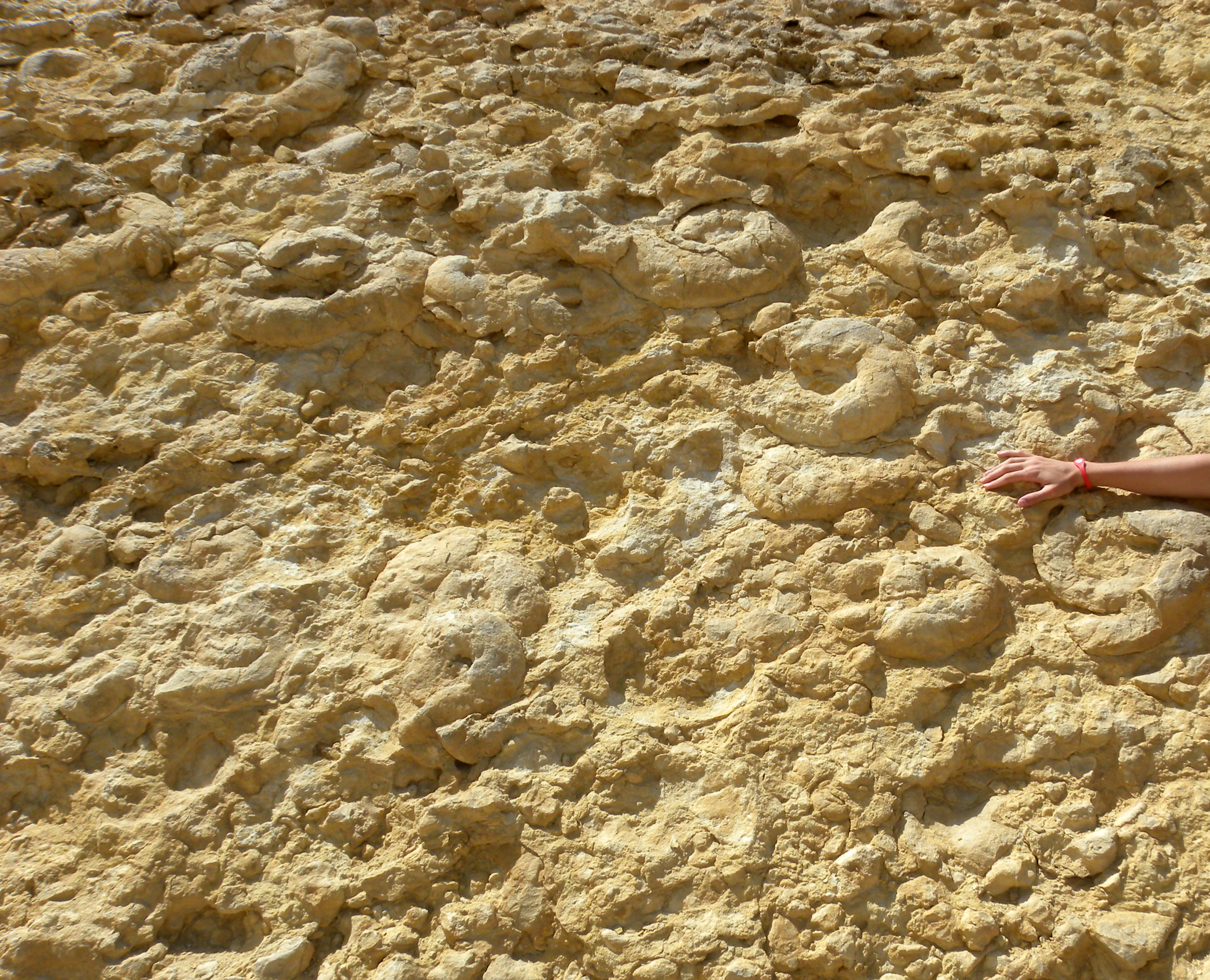
Ammonite Wall (Tamar Formation, Cenomanian)

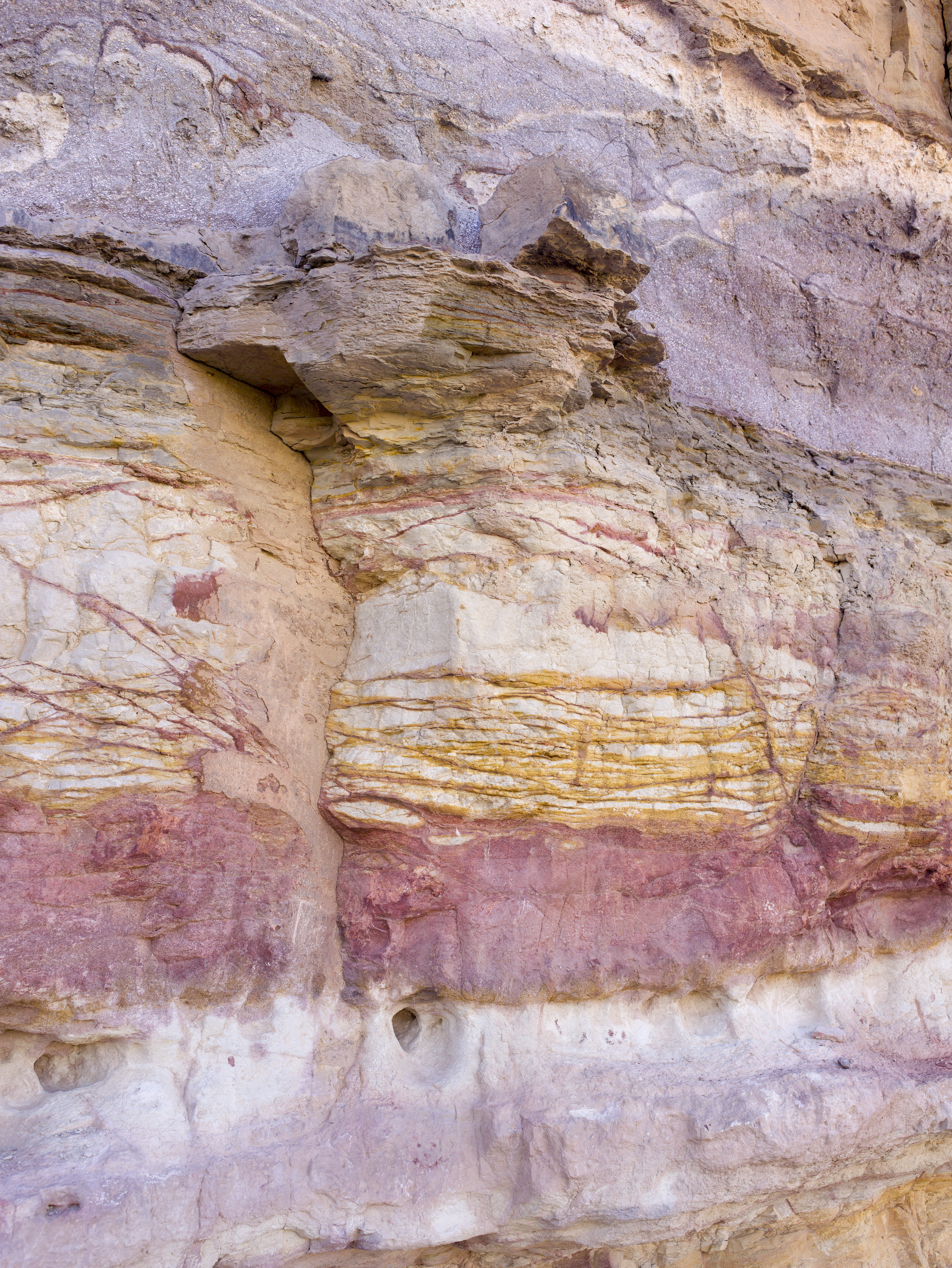
Sandstone color bands

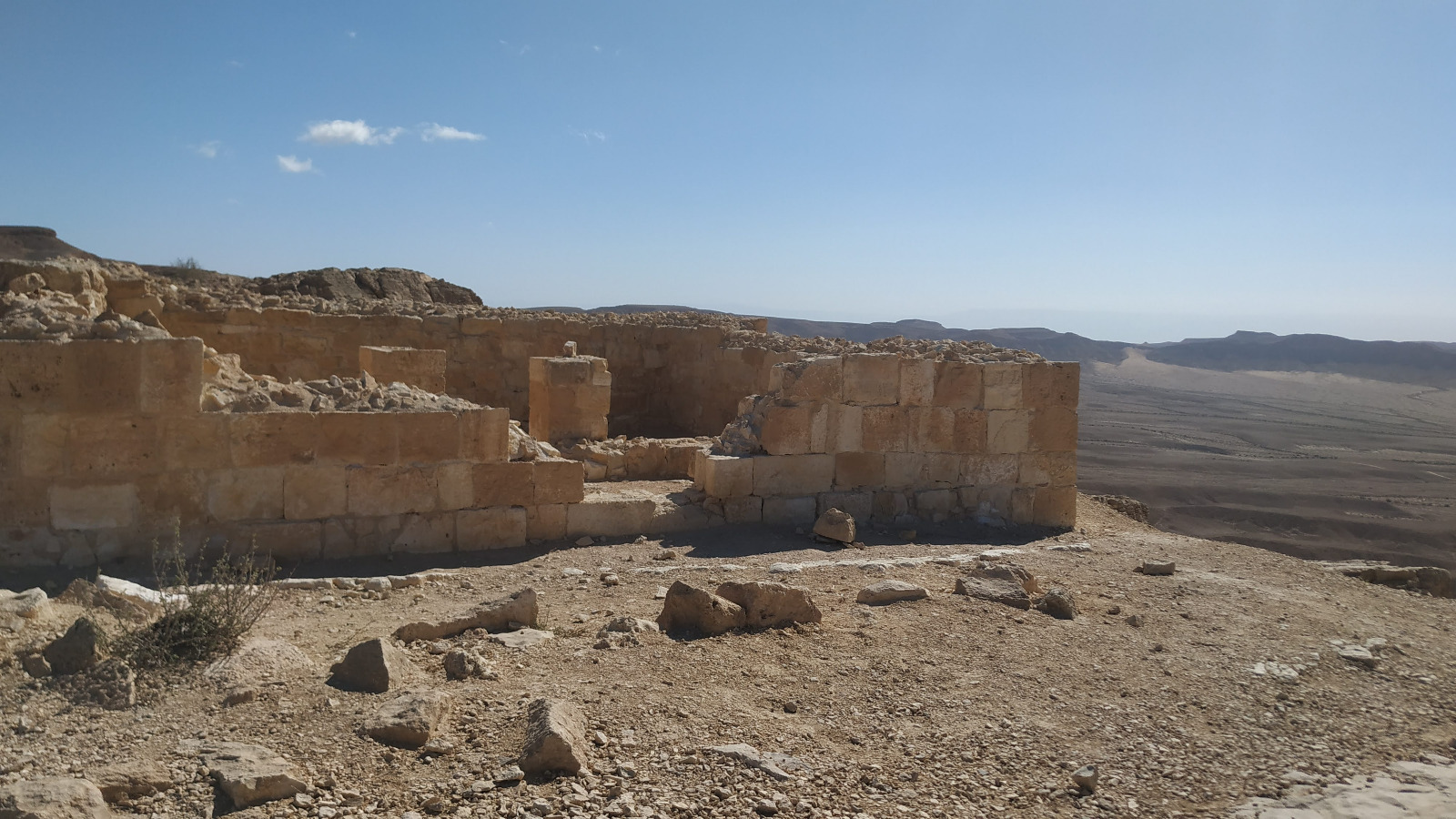
The remnants of Mezad Mahmal on the Incense Route between Petra and Avdat.

== See also ==
- Makhtesh
- HaMakhtesh HaGadol
- HaMakhtesh HaKatan
- Erosion
- Geology of Israel
- Nature reserves in Israel
- Negev Desert
- Mitzpe Ramon
- Geotourism
