= Malleus (disambiguation) =

Malleus (Latin for "hammer") is a bone in the middle ear.

Malleus may also refer to:

- Malleus (bivalve), a genus of bivalves
- Malleus (disease), a bacterial infection
- Malleus Maleficarum (Hammer of Witches), an early modern European treatise on witches

== See also ==
- Malleus Scotorum ("Hammer of the Scots"), byname of King Edward I of England
- Malleolus, a structure in mammalian skeletal anatomy
- Malleolus (arthropod), an external organ chemoreceptor found in Solpugidae
