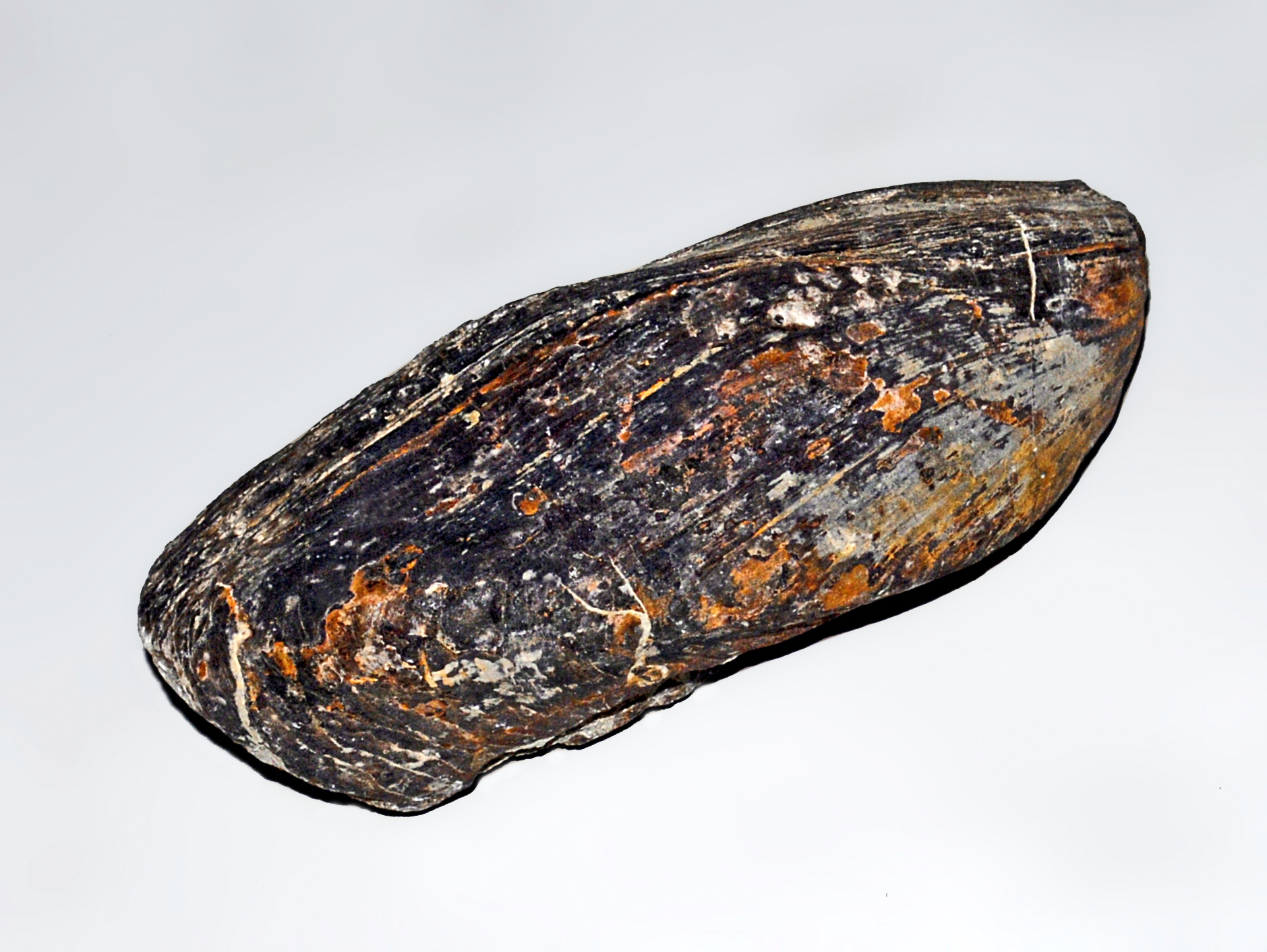
- Gervillia inflata from Rhaetian of Italy

Scientific classification
- Domain: Eukaryota
- Kingdom: Animalia
- Phylum: Mollusca
- Class: Bivalvia
- Order: Pteriida
- Family: †Bakevelliidae
- Genus: †Gervillia; Defrance, 1820

= Gervillia =

Gervillia Temporal range: Carboniferous – Eocene 313.8–37.2 Ma

Extinct genus of bivalves

Gervillia is an extinct genus of prehistoric bivalves belonging to the family Bakevelliidae.

== Fossil records ==
This genus is known in the fossil record from the Carboniferous period to the Eocene period (from about 313.8 to 37.2 million years ago). Fossils of species within this genus have been found in marine sediments all over the world.

== Species ==
Species within this genus include:

- † Gervillia alaeformis Sowerby 1819
- † Gervillia alatior Imlay 1940
- † Gervillia angulata Münster 1841
- † Gervillia angusta Munster 1838
- † Gervillia cholla Stoyanow 1949
- † Gervillia dissita White 1887
- † Gervillia galcazzi Stoppani 1863
- † Gervillia heinemani Stoyanow 1949
- † Gervillia inflata Schafhautl
- † Gervillia iraonensis Newton 1895
- † Gervillia lanpingensis Chen 1976
- † Gervillia longa Geinitz 1867
- † Gervillia metaforbesiana Amano and Matsumoto 1956
- † Gervillia quadrata Chen 1976
- † Gervillia rasori Stoyanow 1949
- † Gervillia regoi Maury 1936
- † Gervillia sergipensisMello et al. 2007
- † Gervillia simbaiana Skwarko 1967
- † Gervillia solenoidea Defrance 1820
- † Gervillia ussurica Kiparisova 1938
- † Gervillia yunnanensis Chen 1976
