= Cassiavellia =

Scientific classification
- Domain: Eukaryota
- Kingdom: Animalia
- Phylum: Mollusca
- Class: Bivalvia
- Order: Pteriida
- Family: †Bakevelliidae
- Genus: †Cassiavellia; Tëmkin and Pojeta Jr, 2010

Species
- Cassiavellia galtarae †; Cassiavellia nadkevnae †

Extinct genus of bivalves

Cassiavellia is an extinct genus of saltwater clams, marine bivalve molluscs in the subclass Pteriomorphia. This genus existed in what is now Texas, during the upper Permian period. The type species is Cassiavellia galtarae, and the genus also contains the species C. nadkevnae.
