= Gervillaria =

Gervillaria Temporal range: Triassic - Cretaceous

Scientific classification
- Kingdom: Animalia
- Phylum: Mollusca
- Class: Bivalvia
- Order: Pteriida
- Family: †Bakevelliidae
- Genus: †Gervillaria; Cox, 1955

Extinct genus of bivalves

Gervillaria is an extinct genus of saltwater clams, marine bivalve molluscs that lived from the Triassic to the Cretaceous in Asia, Europe, North America, and South America.
