= Cassianellidae =

Cassianellidae Temporal range: Landinian - Norian 237.0–203.6 Ma

Scientific classification
- Kingdom: Animalia
- Phylum: Mollusca
- Class: Bivalvia
- Order: Pteriida
- Superfamily: Pterioidea
- Genus: †Cassianellidae; Ichikawa, 1958

Genera
- See text

Extinct family of bivalves

Cassianellidae is a small extinct family of prehistoric bivalves which lived from the Middle Triassic, Ladinian stage through the Late Triassic Norian stage. It has been suggested that the family may have evolved from the related family Bakevelliidae. Bakevelliidae species are found in North America, South America, Europe, the Middle East, and Asia. Living a stationary life attached to substrate in marine and brackish environments, they formed shells of an aragonite composition with a low amount of magnesium calcite. The family Cassianellidae was named by K. Ichikawa in 1958.

== Description ==
The cassianellids are noted for being restricted to the Triassic only, going extinct during the end Triassic extinction event. They are thought to have a close relationship to the longer lived family Bakevelliidae and it is possible the cassianellids may have even evolved from one of the early Triassic bakevelliid genera. As is found in the Bakevelliidae genus Kobayashites and the Isognomonidae genus Lithiotis, cassianellids are distinguished by the presence of a larval septum which is retained in the adult shell morphology. Also notable for the entire family is the presence of a primitive alivincular type ligament, termed an alivincular-areate ligament. This form of ligament was widely found in many of the Triassic bivalve families but evolution of more refined ligament systems resulted in the shift away from the alivincular-areate system. Only a few modern families, such as Gryphaeidae, still retain the alivincular-areate ligament system. Several of the genera, such as Cassianella, have a widespread distribution. In contrast, Lilangina is known only from Asia, and Septihoernesia from the middle Triassic of northern Italy.

== Taxonomy ==
Cassianellidae Ichikawa, 1958

- Genus Burckhardtia Frech, 1907
- Genus Cassianella Beyrich, 1862 (synonyms = Acinophorus Meek, 1864, Gryphorhynchus Meek, 1864)
- Genus Hoernesiella Gugenberger, 1934
- Genus Lilangina Diener, 1906
- Genus Reubenia Cox, 1924
- Genus Septihoernesia Cox, 1964
