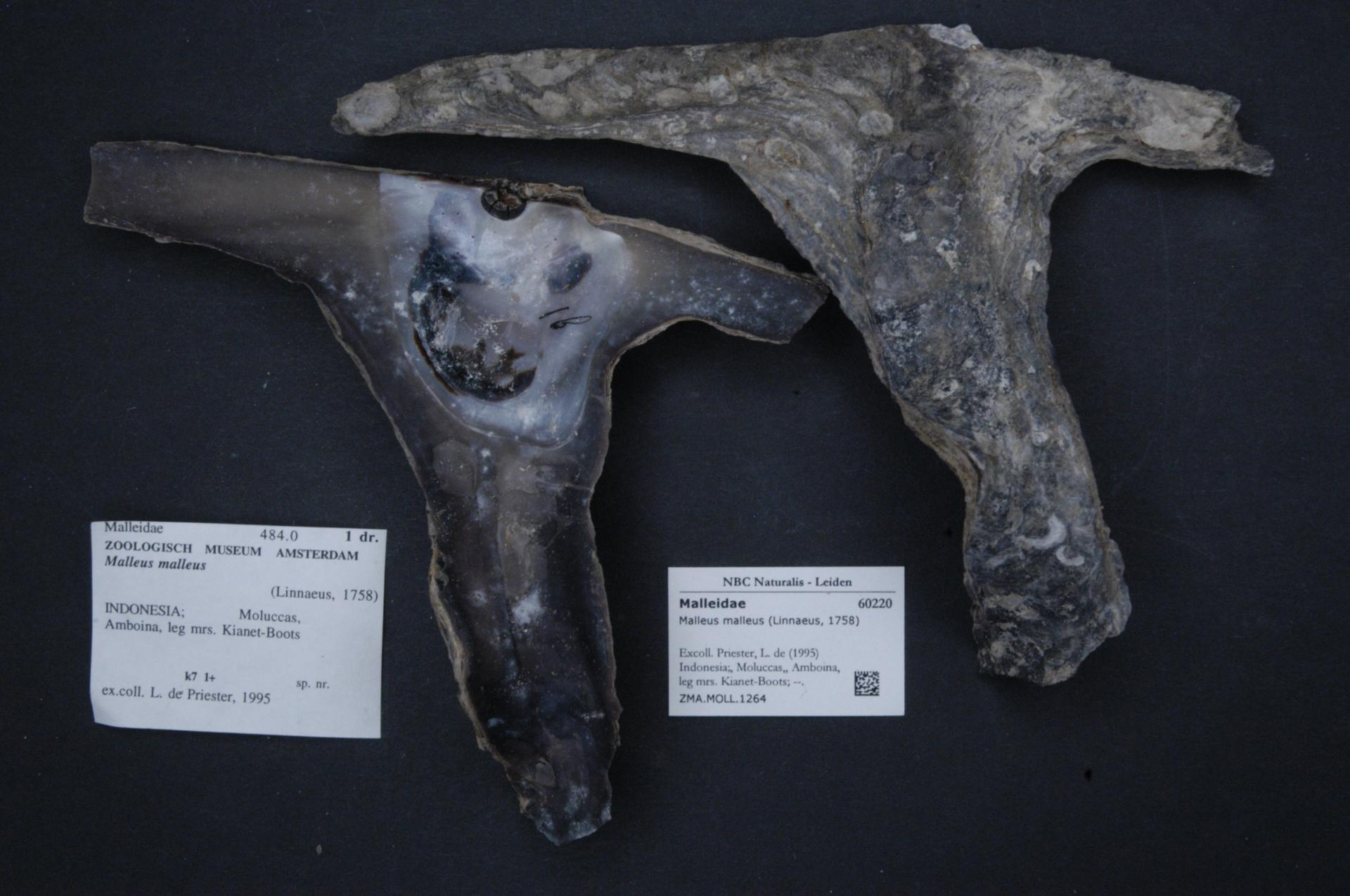
- Malleus malleus (Linnaeus, 1758), museum specimens

Scientific classification
- Domain: Eukaryota
- Kingdom: Animalia
- Phylum: Mollusca
- Class: Bivalvia
- Order: Pteriida
- Family: Malleidae
- Genus: Malleus; Lamarck, 1799

= Malleus (bivalve) =

Genus of bivalves

Malleus is a genus of hammer oysters (marine bivalve mollusks) in the family Malleidae. This genus includes 27 known species.

Characteristic of this genus is the unusual "hammer-shaped" outline of the valves. The shells are nearly equivalved, but the hinge line is extremely long and is at nearly a right angle to the rest of the valves, which grow ventrally. The viscera of the organism are arranged in an oval-shaped patch near the umbones of the valves.

== Species ==
- Malleus albus Lamarck, 1819
- Malleus anatinus (Gmelin, 1791)
- Malleus candeanus (d'Orbigny, 1853)
- Malleus daemoniacus Reeve, 1858
- Malleus legumen Reeve, 1858
- Malleus malleus (Linnaeus, 1758)
- Malleus meridianus Cotton, 1930
- Malleus regula (Forsskål in Niebuhr, 1775)

== Gallery ==
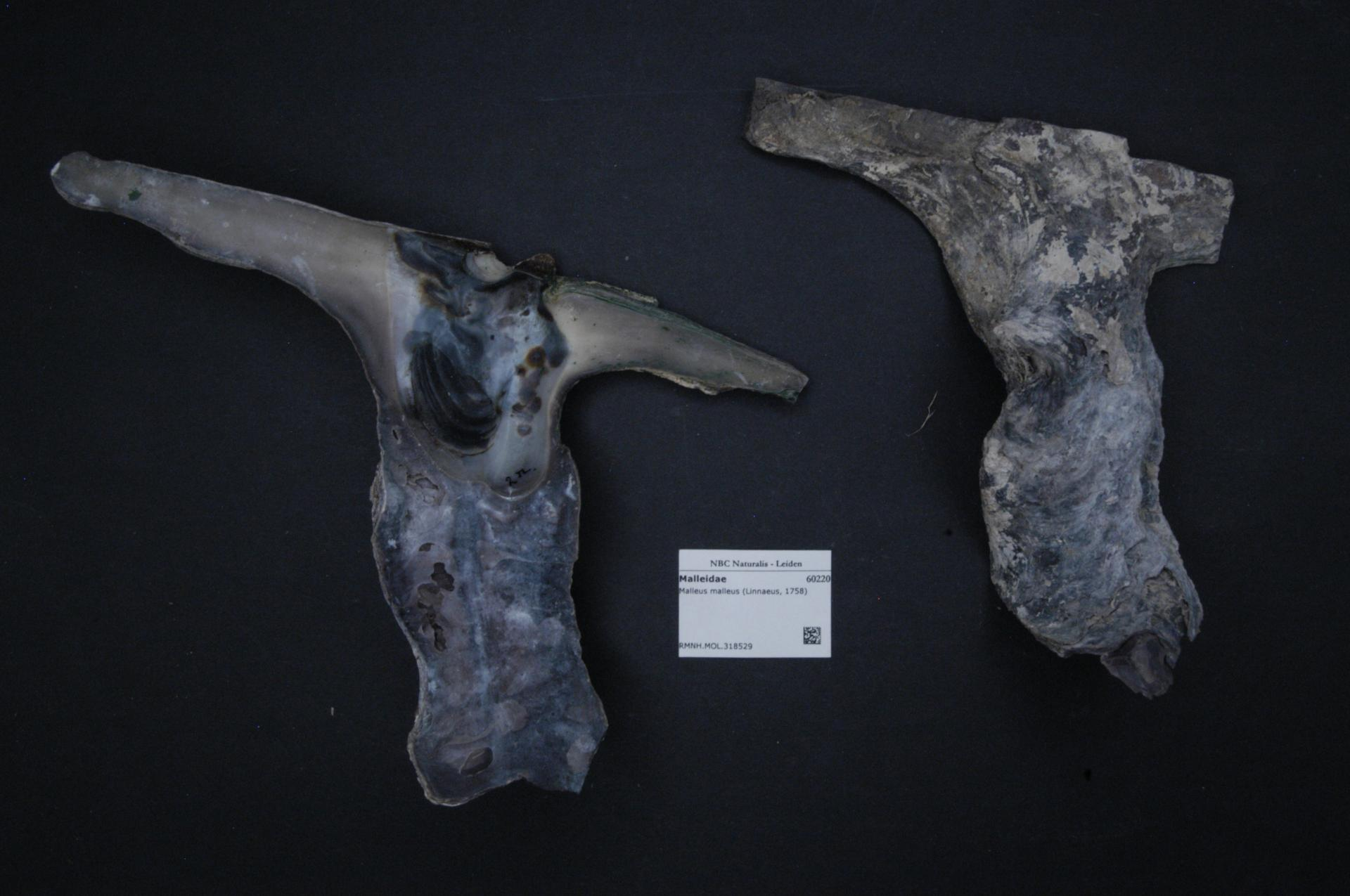
Malleus malleus (Linnaeus, 1758)

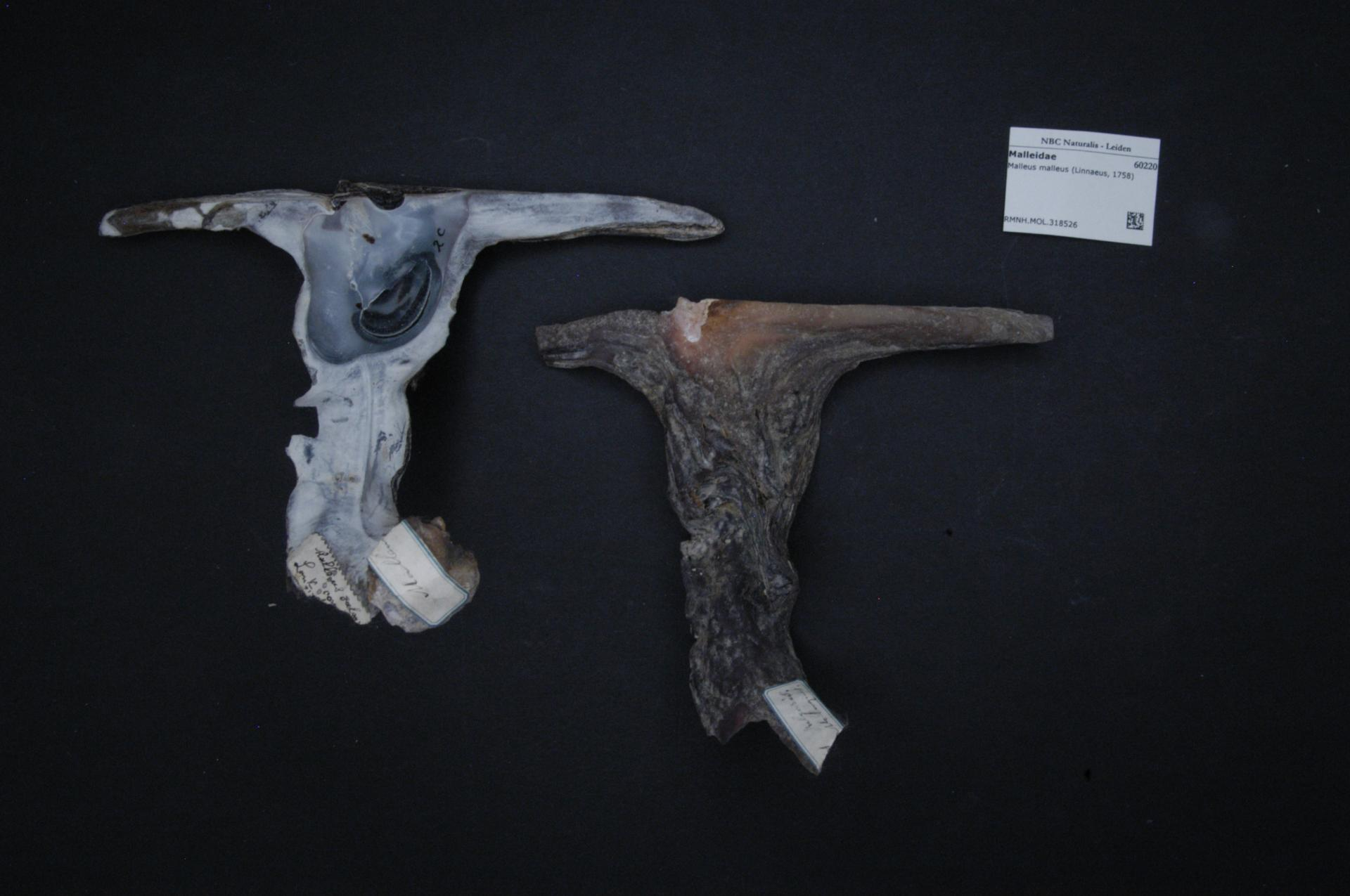
Malleus malleus (Linnaeus, 1758)

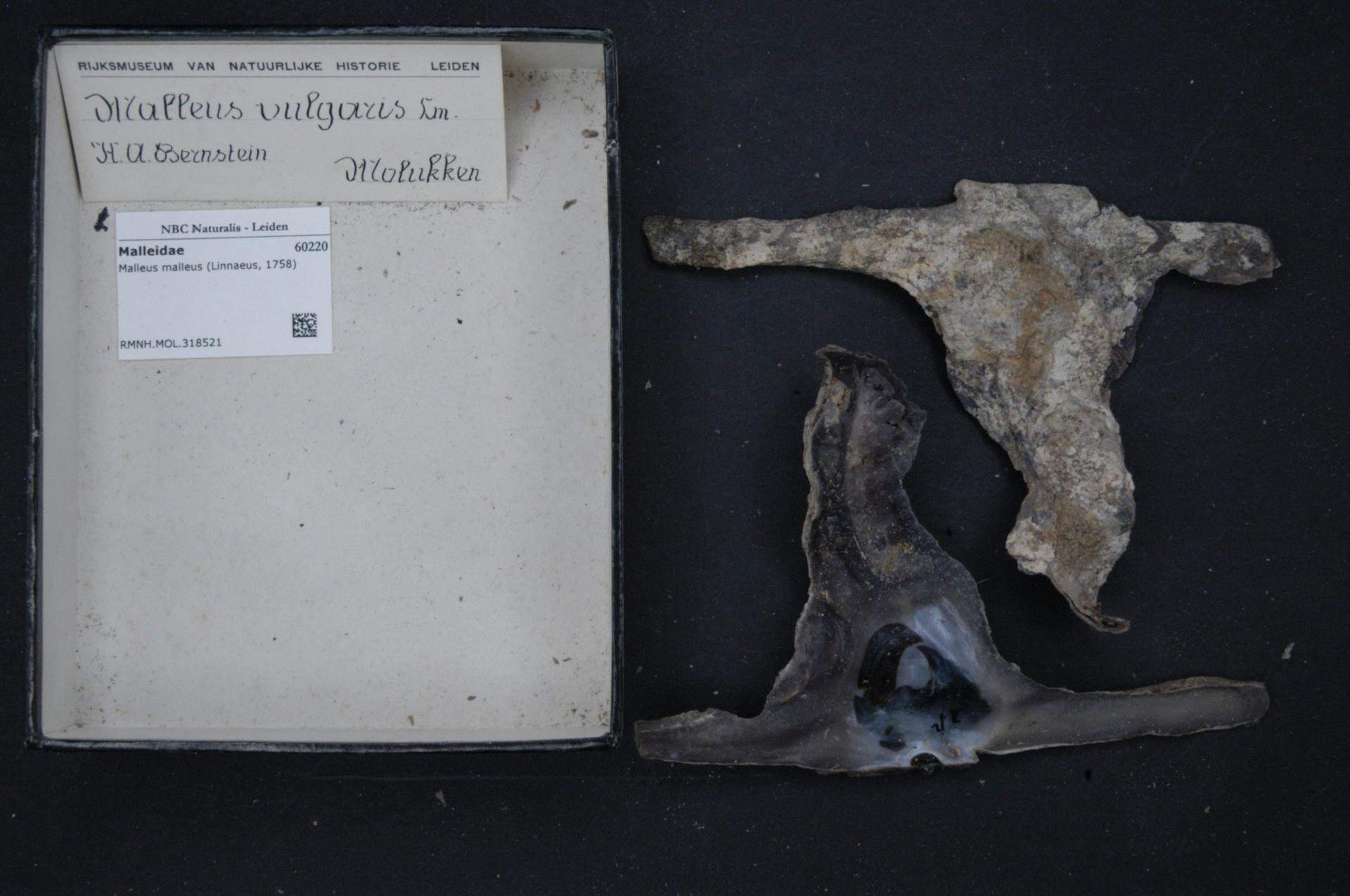
Malleus malleus (Linnaeus, 1758)

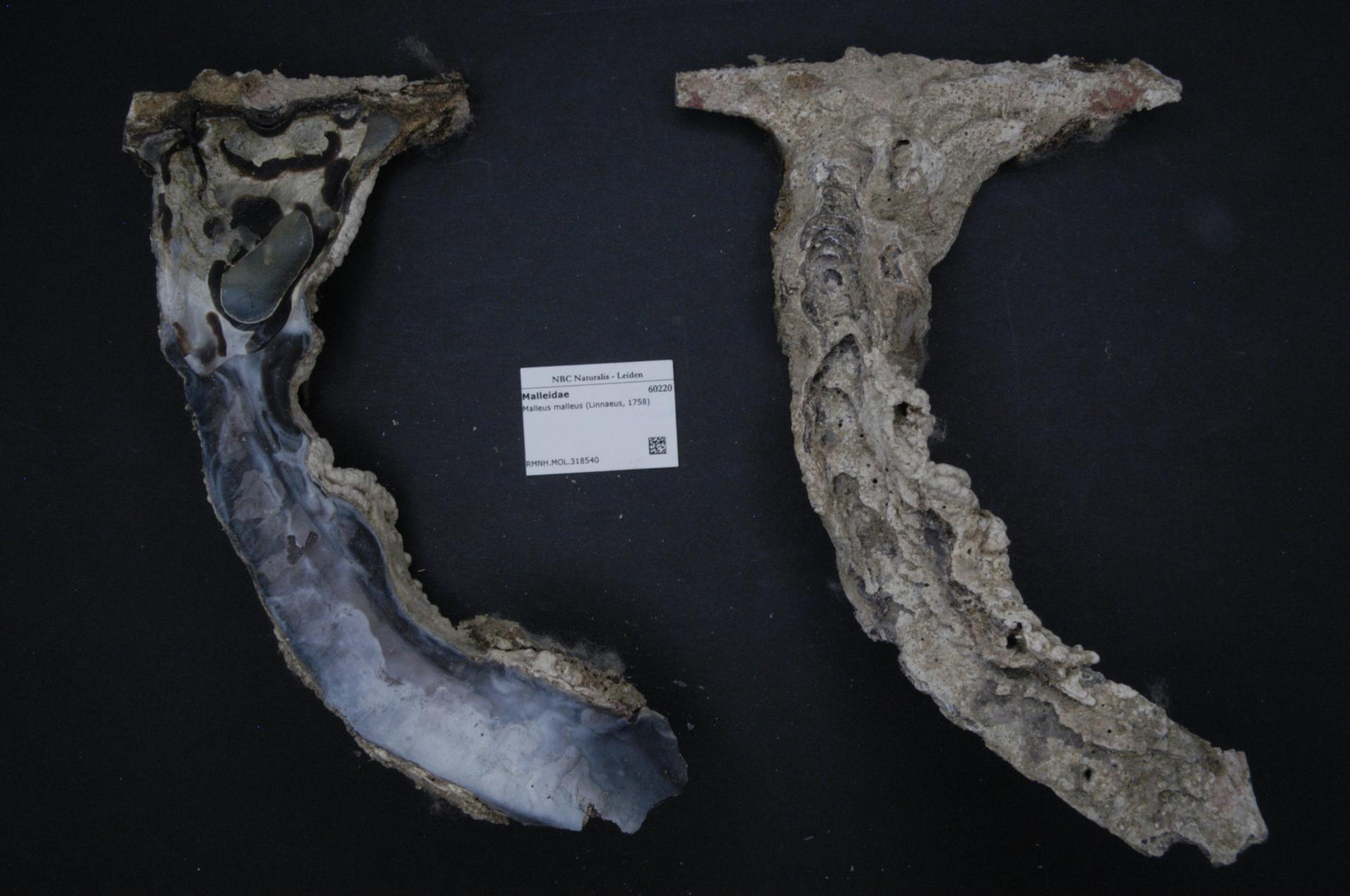
Malleus malleus (Linnaeus, 1758)
