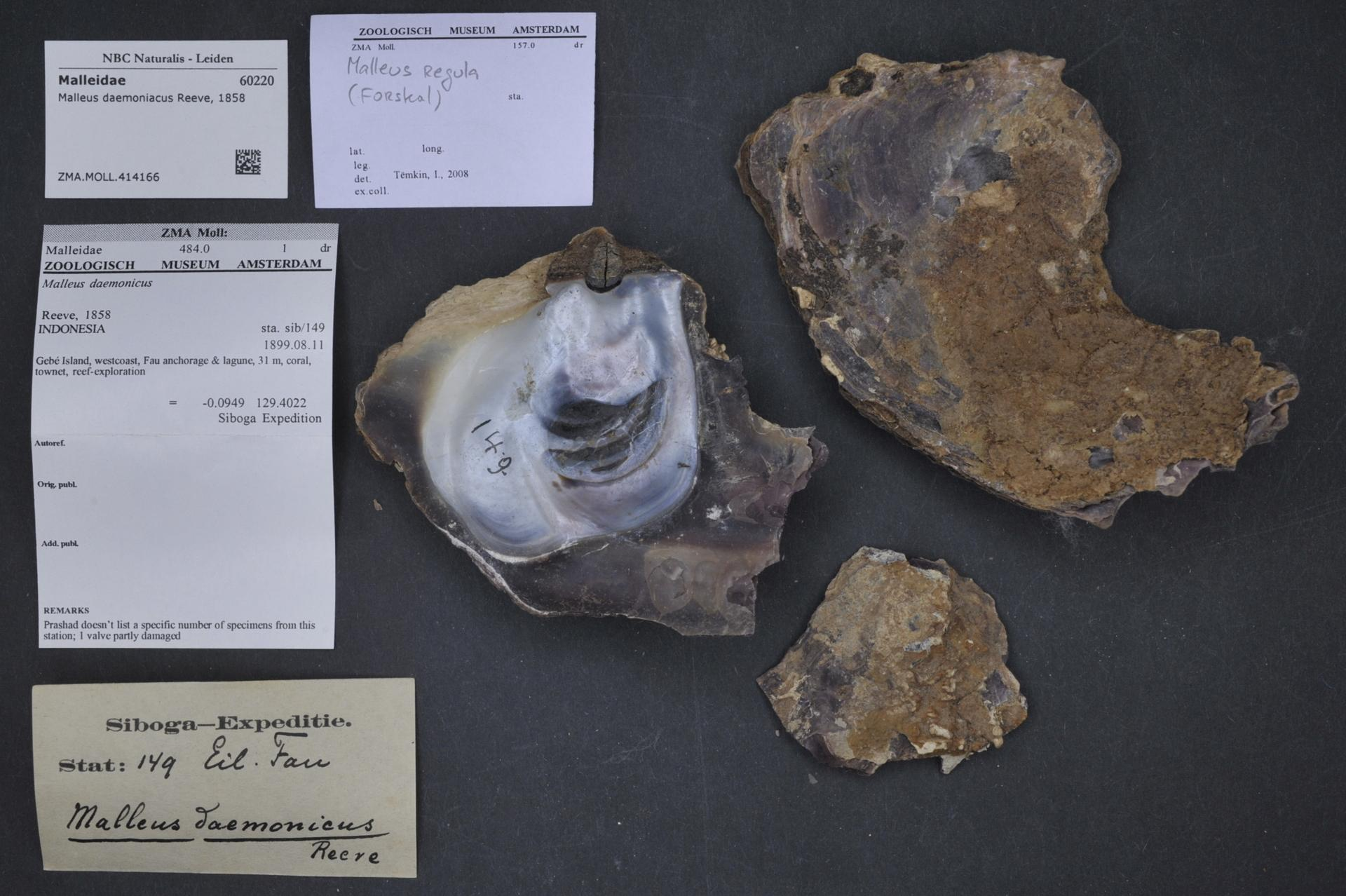

Scientific classification
- Kingdom: Animalia
- Phylum: Mollusca
- Class: Bivalvia
- Order: Pteriida
- Superfamily: Pterioidea
- Family: Malleidae

Genera
- See text

= Malleidae =

Hammer oyster

Family of bivalves

Malleidae, or hammer oysters, is a family of saltwater clams. They are related to the pearl oysters, in the order Pteriida and the superfamily Pterioidea. There are about 22 species in this family.

The shells of most of these animals are T-shaped, with the hinge along the top of the T, and with the byssus emerging from the hinge. An oblique ligament holds the hinge. The shell is partially nacreous. There is a single, large adductor muscle. The exhalant current exits at the hinge.

Most hammer oysters live in tropical, coralline areas.

== Genera ==
- Malleus Lamarck, 1799
- Neoaviculovulsa Okutani & Kusakari, 1987
- Vulsella

The following genera have been brought into synonymy.

- Brevimalleus McLean, 1947 accepted as Malleus Lamarck, 1799
- Fundella Gregorio, 1884 accepted as Malleus Lamarck, 1799
- Himantopoda Schumacher, 1817 accepted as Malleus Lamarck, 1799
- Malleolus Rafinesque, 1815 accepted as Malleus Lamarck, 1799
- Malvufundus de Gregorio, 1885 accepted as Malleus Lamarck, 1799
- Parimalleus Iredale, 1931 accepted as Malleus Lamarck, 1799
- Tudes Oken, 1815 accepted as Malleus Lamarck, 1799
