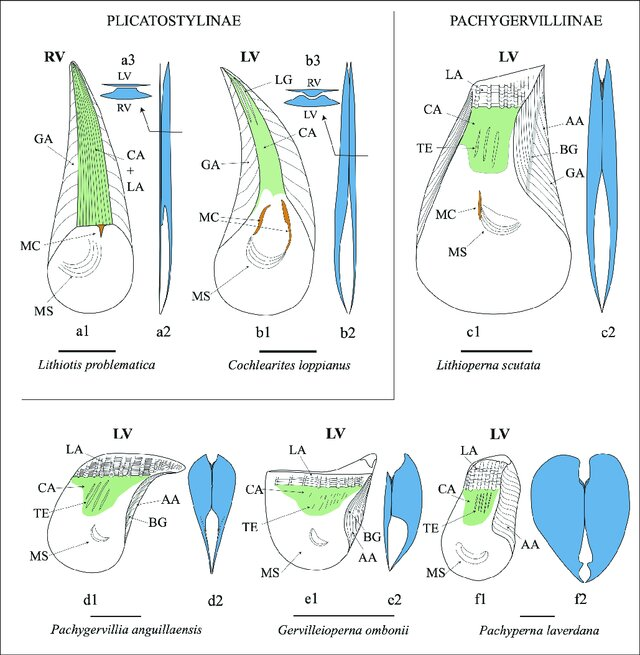
- Selection of members of the extinct Plicatostylidae family

Scientific classification
- Kingdom: Animalia
- Phylum: Mollusca
- Class: Bivalvia
- Order: Pteriida
- Superfamily: Pterioidea; Gray 1840 (1820)

= Pterioidea =

Superfamily of bivalves

Pterioidea is a superfamily of epifaunal marine bivalves mostly inhabiting continental shelf regions of tropical and subtropical oceans. The superfamily includes the economically-important saltwater pearl oysters as well as the oddly shaped hammer oysters (neither of which, however, is considered a true oyster). A number of species have found use as model organisms in the fields of medicine and science.

It includes the following three accepted living families:

- Malleidae, the hammer oysters, Lamarck, 1818
- Pteriidae, the pearl oysters, tree oysters, and winged oysters, Gray, 1847 (1820)
- Pulvinitidae, a family of rare deep sea oysters, no common name, Stephenson, 1941

Fossil families include:

- Family †Aviculopectinidae
- Family †Bakevelliidae
- Family †Cassianellidae
- Family †Isognomonidae
- Family †Kochiidae
- Family †Pergamidiidae
- Family †Plicatostylidae
- Family †Posidoniidae
- Family †Pterineidae
- Family †Retroceramidae
