= Pulvinitidae =

Scientific classification
- Kingdom: Animalia
- Phylum: Mollusca
- Class: Bivalvia
- Order: Pteriida
- Superfamily: Pterioidea
- Family: Pulvinitidae; Stephenson, 1941

Genera
- See text

Family of bivalves

Pulvinitidae is a family of saltwater clams, marine bivalve molluscs in the order Pteriida. These bivalves are related to the scallops and oysters. Originally believed to be extinct and known only from fossil records, non-fossil shells of members of this family were first discovered in 1913 by the Australian research vessel HMS Endeavour off the coast of Victoria. Sixty years later, live specimens were finally discovered on the wing of a wrecked airplane at a depth of over 400 meters.

== Genera and species ==
Genera and species within the family Pulvinitidae include:

- Pulvinites de France 1824
  - Pulvinites adansoni de France 1824
  - Pulvinites antarctica
  - Pulvinites argenteus
  - Pulvinites dysporista
  - Pulvinites exempla
  - Pulvinites lawrencei
  - Pulvinites liasicus
