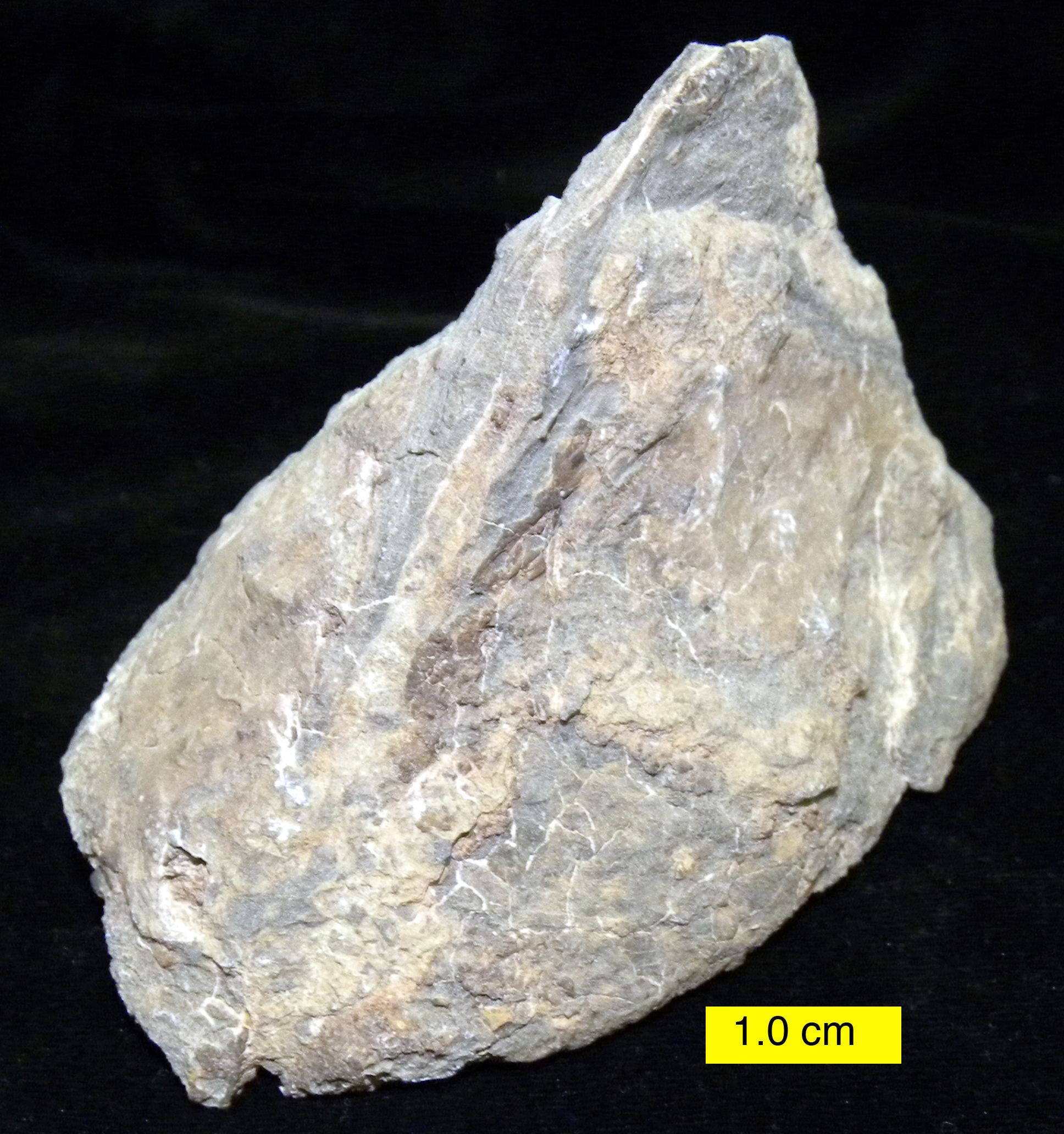
- Ramonalina ramanensis (Triassic, southern Israel)

Scientific classification
- Kingdom: Animalia
- Phylum: Mollusca
- Class: Bivalvia
- Order: Pteriida
- Superfamily: †Ambonychioidea
- Family: †Ramonalinidae; Yancey et al. 2009

Genera
- See text

= Ramonalinidae =

Ramonalinidae Temporal range: Anisian

Extinct family of bivalves

Ramonalinidae is an extinct family of marine bivalve molluscs from the late Anisian (early Middle Triassic). It was an edgewise-recliner with a flattened anteroventral surface (on which it rested) and partially fused valves. They formed distinctive mud mounds.

== Taxonomy ==
- Ramonalina is thus far the only known genus.
