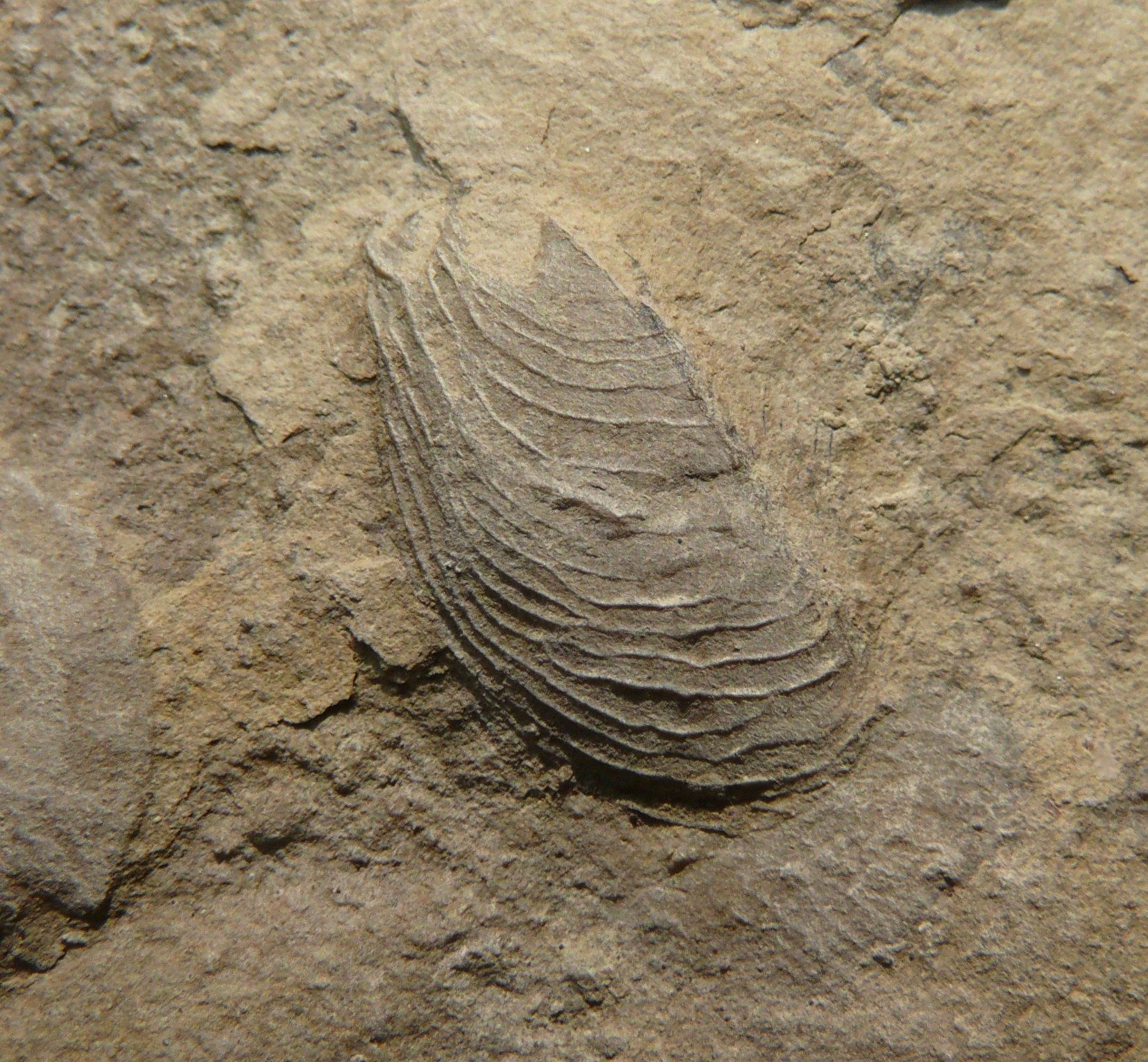
- Bakevellia costata fossil

Scientific classification
- Kingdom: Animalia
- Phylum: Mollusca
- Class: Bivalvia
- Order: Pteriida
- Superfamily: Pterioidea
- Family: †Bakevelliidae; King, 1850

Genera
- See text

= Bakevelliidae =

Bakevelliidae Temporal range: Serpukhovian – Bartonian 326.4–37.2 Ma

Extinct family of bivalves

Bakevelliidae is an extinct family of prehistoric bivalves that lived from the Late Mississippian until the Middle Eocene. Bakevelliidae species are found worldwide, excluding Antarctica. Living a stationary life attached to substrate in marine and brackish environments, they formed shells of an aragonite composition with a low amount of magnesium calcite. The family was named by William King in 1850. At least one genus in the family, Hoernesia, has a notably twisted commissure join.

== Morphology ==
Generally the family consists of species with elongate shells with notably unequal valves. Some of the genera have lost the small anterior auricle but all lack a byssal notch. The shell structuring consists of a regular prismatic calcitic outer layer and an interior layering which is nacreous. The valve surfaces show multiple pits where the valve ligaments were attached. The valve dentition generally consisted of a series of short, transverse teeth along the anterior edge and a few more elongated teeth along the sides. Shells of the included genera range from having radial sculpturing to not having any radial sculpture. Several of the species have an early growth period in which the valve ligament is anchored in a single pit in the shell. When the species size exceeded approximately 6 millimetres (0.24 in) the ligament attachment would develop to encompass two or more pits. One possible species of Bakevelliid from the early Triassic of Utah is tentatively included in the genus Bakevellia but is noted for having an adult shell with only one ligament attachment pit, contrary to the normal state of the rest of the family.

== Taxonomy ==
Taxonomy taken from The Paleobiology Database.

Bakevelliidae King, 1850

- Genus Aguilerella Chavan, 1951
- Genus Aguileria White, 1887
- Genus Bakevellia King, 1848
  - Subgenus Bakevellia (Bakevellia) King, 1848
  - Subgenus Bakevellia (Boreiobakevellia) Kurushin, 1980
  - Subgenus Bakevellia (Maizuria) Nakazawa, 1959
  - Subgenus Bakevellia (Neobakevellia) Nakazawa, 1959
- Genus Cassiavellia Tëmkin & Pojeta, Jr., 2010
- Genus Costigervillia Cox, 1948
- Genus Cultriopsis
- Genus Cuneigervillia Cox, 1954
- Genus Gervillaria Cox, 1951
- Genus Gervillella Waagen, 1907
- Genus Gervillia Defrance, 1820
  - Subgenus Gervillia (Cultriopsis) Cossman, 1904
  - Subgenus Gervillia (Gervillia) Defrance, 1820
- Genus Gervilliopsis Whitfield, 1885
- Genus Hoernesia
  - Subgenus Hoernesia (Strophopteria) Guo, 1985
- Genus Kedonella Polubotko, 1992
- Genus Kobayashites Hayami, 1959
- Genus Marmaronia Larghi, 200
- Genus Panis Stephenson, 1953
- Genus Permoperna (Nakazawa & Newell, 1968)
- Genus Pseudoptera Meek, 1873
- Genus Tenuipteria Stephenson, 1955
- Genus Towapteria Nakazawa & Newell, 1968
