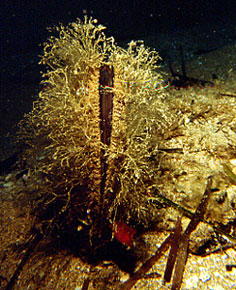
- A live individual of Pinna nobilis in the Pinnidae

Scientific classification
- Kingdom: Animalia
- Phylum: Mollusca
- Class: Bivalvia
- Subclass: Pteriomorphia
- Order: Pteriida; Newell, 1965

Families
- See text

Synonyms
- Pterioida

= Pteriida =

Order of bivalves

The Pteriida are an order of large and medium-sized marine bivalve mollusks. It includes five families, among them the Pteriidae (pearl oysters and winged oysters).

== Taxonomy ==
The following is the phylogenetic tree based on complete mitochondrial genomes per Liu et al. (2019):

- - - Ostreida
    - Pteriida
  - - Mytilida
    - Arcida
- Pectinida

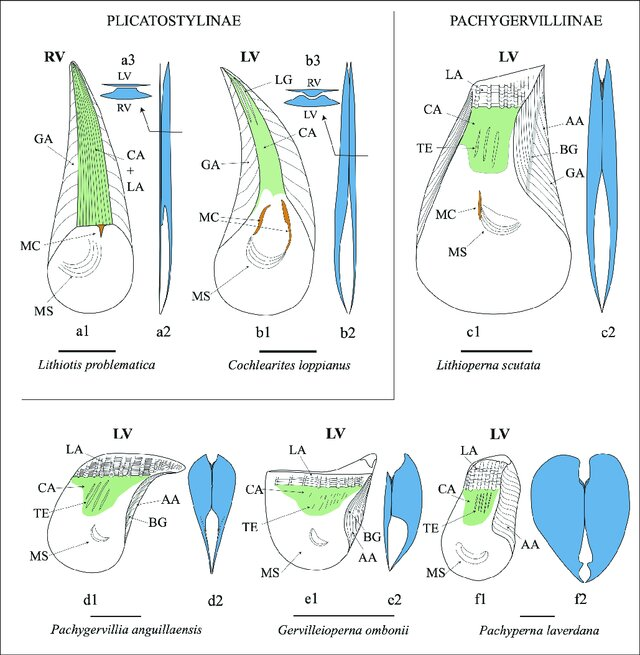
Selection of members of the extinct Plicatostylidae

In 2010, a new proposed classification system for the Bivalvia was published by Bieler, Carter & Coan, revising the classification of the Bivalvia, including the suborder Pteriida.

- Superfamily Ambonychioidea
  - Family †Alatoconchidae
  - Family †Ambonychiidae
  - Family †Inoceramidae
  - Family †Lunulacardiidae
  - Family †Monopteriidae
  - Family †Myalinidae
  - Family †Mysidiellidae
  - Family †Ramonalinidae
- Superfamily Pinnoidea
  - Family Pinnidae
- Superfamily †Posidonioidea Neumayr, 1891
  - Family †Posidoniidae Neumayr, 1891 (Devonian to Cretaceous)
  - Family †Aulacomyellidae Ichikawa, 1958
  - Family †Daonellidae Neumayr, 1891
  - Family †Halobiidae Kittl, 1912 (Devonian to Triassic)
- Superfamily Pterioidea
  - Family †Bakevelliidae (Triassic to Eocene)
  - Family †Cassianellidae (Middle to Late Triassic)
  - Family †Kochiidae
  - Family Malleidae
  - Family †Pergamidiidae (Triassic to Cretaceous)
  - Family †Plicatostylidae (Jurassic)
  - Family †Posidoniidae
  - Family †Pterineidae
  - Family Pteriidae
  - Family Pulvinitidae
  - Family †Retroceramidae
- Superfamily †Rhombopterioidea Korobkov in Eberzin, 1960
  - Family †Rhombopteriidae Korobkov in Eberzin, 1960 (Silurian to Devonian)
  - Family †Umburridae P. A. Johnston, 1991 (Silurian)
