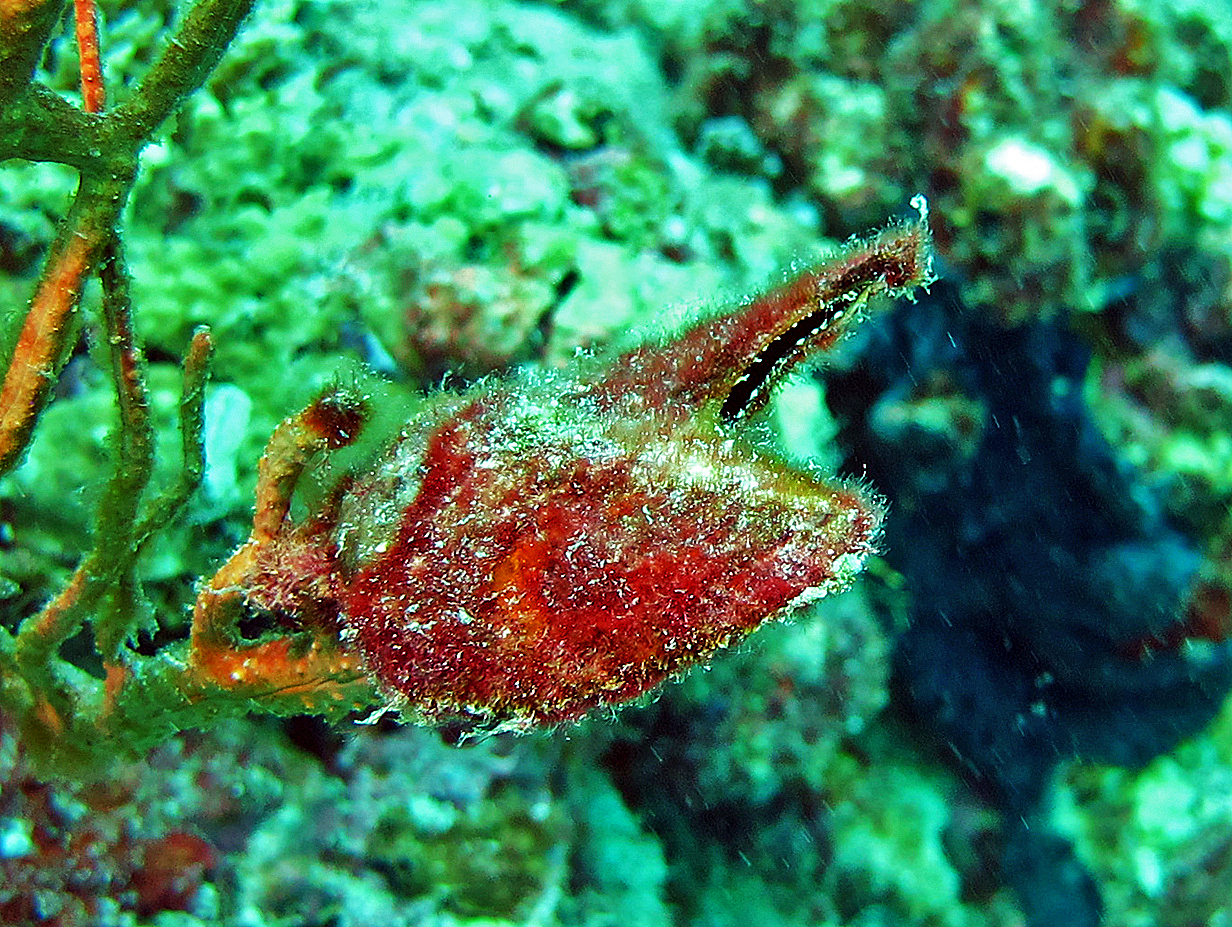
- Pteria penguin live from Maldives

Scientific classification
- Kingdom: Animalia
- Phylum: Mollusca
- Class: Bivalvia
- Order: Pteriida
- Family: Pteriidae
- Genus: Pteria
- Species: P. penguin

Binomial name
- Pteria penguin (Röding, 1798)

Synonyms
- List: Austropteria maccullochi Iredale, 1939; Austropteria perscitula Iredale, 1939; Avicula lotorium Lamarck, 1819; Avicula macroptera Lamarck, 1819; Avicula peasei Dunker, 1872; Avicula radiata Pease, 1862; Avicula semisagitta Lamarck, 1819; Avicula vespertilio Deshayes, 1830; Magnavicula bennetti Iredale, 1939; Pinctada penguin Röding, 1798; Pteria macroptera; Pteria semisagitta (Lamarck, 1819)

= Pteria penguin =

Species of bivalve

Pteria penguin, commonly known as the penguin's wing oyster, penguin wing oyster, and penguin's wing , is a species of marine bivalve mollusk in the family Pteriidae, the pearl oysters. It is native to the western and central Indo-Pacific region and is used for the production of cultured pearls. The generic name comes from Greek πτερον (pteron) meaning wing.

== Distribution and habitat ==
Pteria penguin is native to the western and central Indo-Pacific region. Its range extends from the East African coast and the Red Sea to India, southern China, southern Japan, the Philippines, Indonesia and northern Australia. It is found attached by its byssal threads to a number of different substrates, rocks and corals (especially to Gorgonacea), at intertidal depths of less than 35 m (115 ft).

== Description ==
Pteria penguin can reach a common shell length of about 20 cm (7.9 in), with a maximum length of 30 cm (12 in). The shells of this rather large species are solid and ovate. The posterior ear develops a narrow, elongated, wing-like expansion. The left valve is more inflated than the right one. The outside color of the shell ranges from dark brown to black, while the interior is nacreous silvery, a wide non-nacreous glossy black margin

== Biology ==
As well as most of the species of the class Bivalvia, wing oysters are gonochoric. Embryos of this species at first develop into a free-swimming planktonic marine larva, then followed by a veliger, quite similar to a small clam.

== Pearl culture ==
Wild oysters of this species seldom contain pearls. When they do, they tend to be irregular in shape and have the same range of pinkish hues that are typical of the nacre lining the shells. The maximum diameter of the pearls is about 13 mm (0.5 in). Because the shell valves of this species are so thin, it was beyond the competence of nineteenth century oyster culturists to use it for pearl production.

With modern techniques, seeding has become easier and Pteria penguin has joined Pteria sterna, another member of the genus Pteria, as being a major producer of cultured pearls. Most of the pearls produced by Pteria penguin are "mabé pearls", also known as bubble or half pearls, formed between the mantle and the shell valve and having one flattened side. The production of round pearls is possible but requires more advanced techniques in seeding. Naturally occurring spat can be collected on spat collectors for growing on into mature oysters, and there are some hatcheries producing spat on a commercial scale. These oysters are cultured on the Ryukyu Islands, along the southern coast of China, on Phuket Island in Thailand and on Vava'u in Tonga.

== Gallery ==
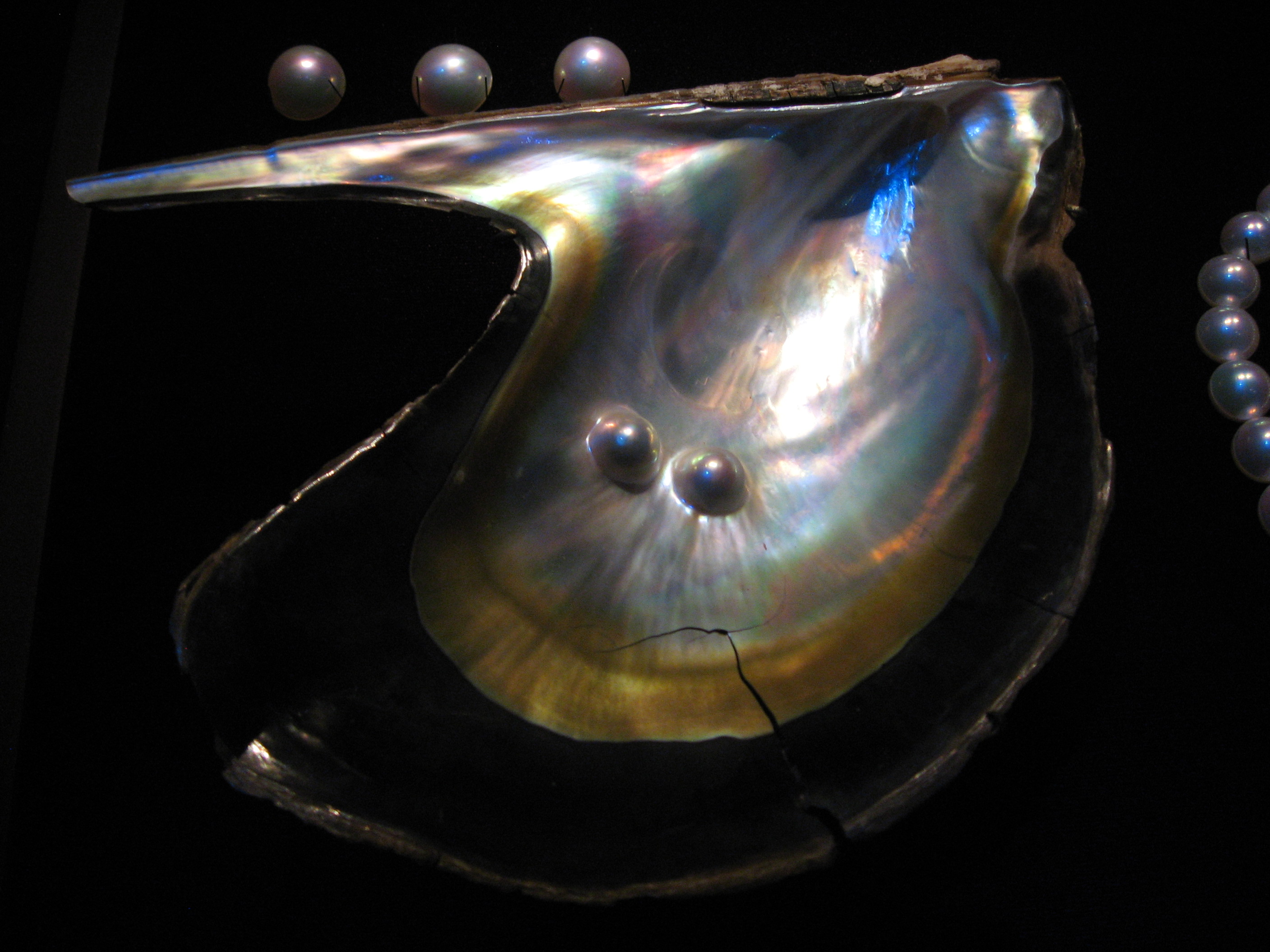
Interior valve with pearls

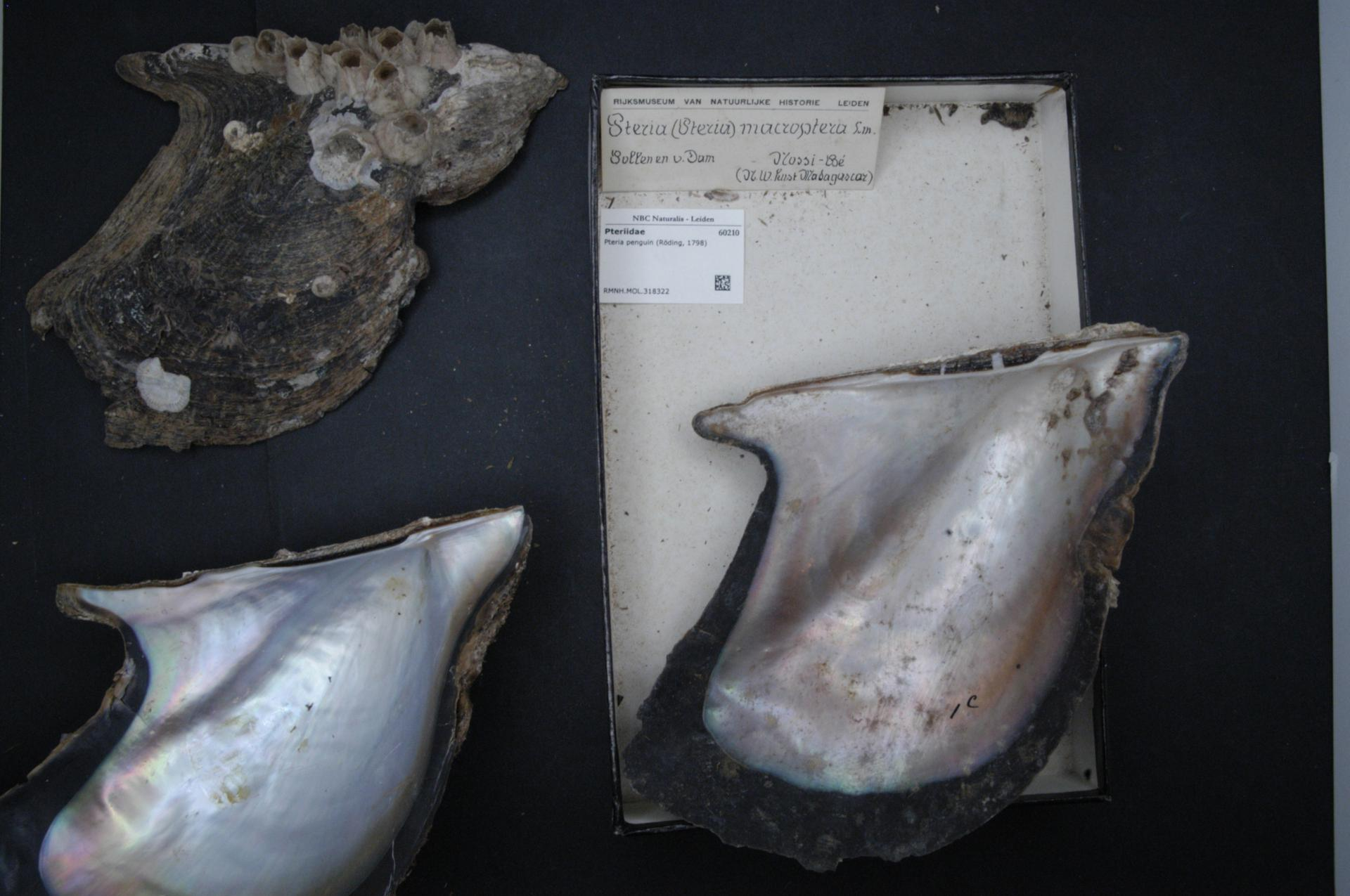
Museum specimens

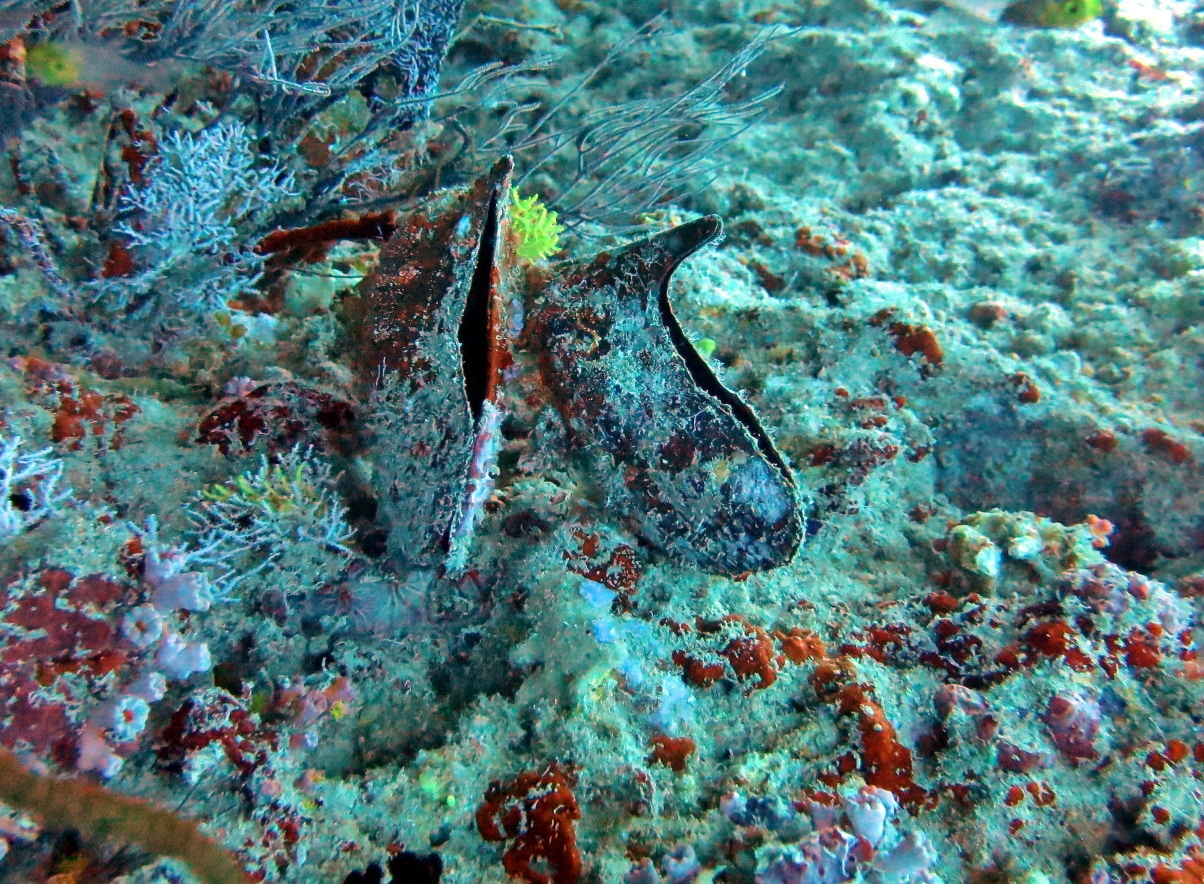
Two specimens live
