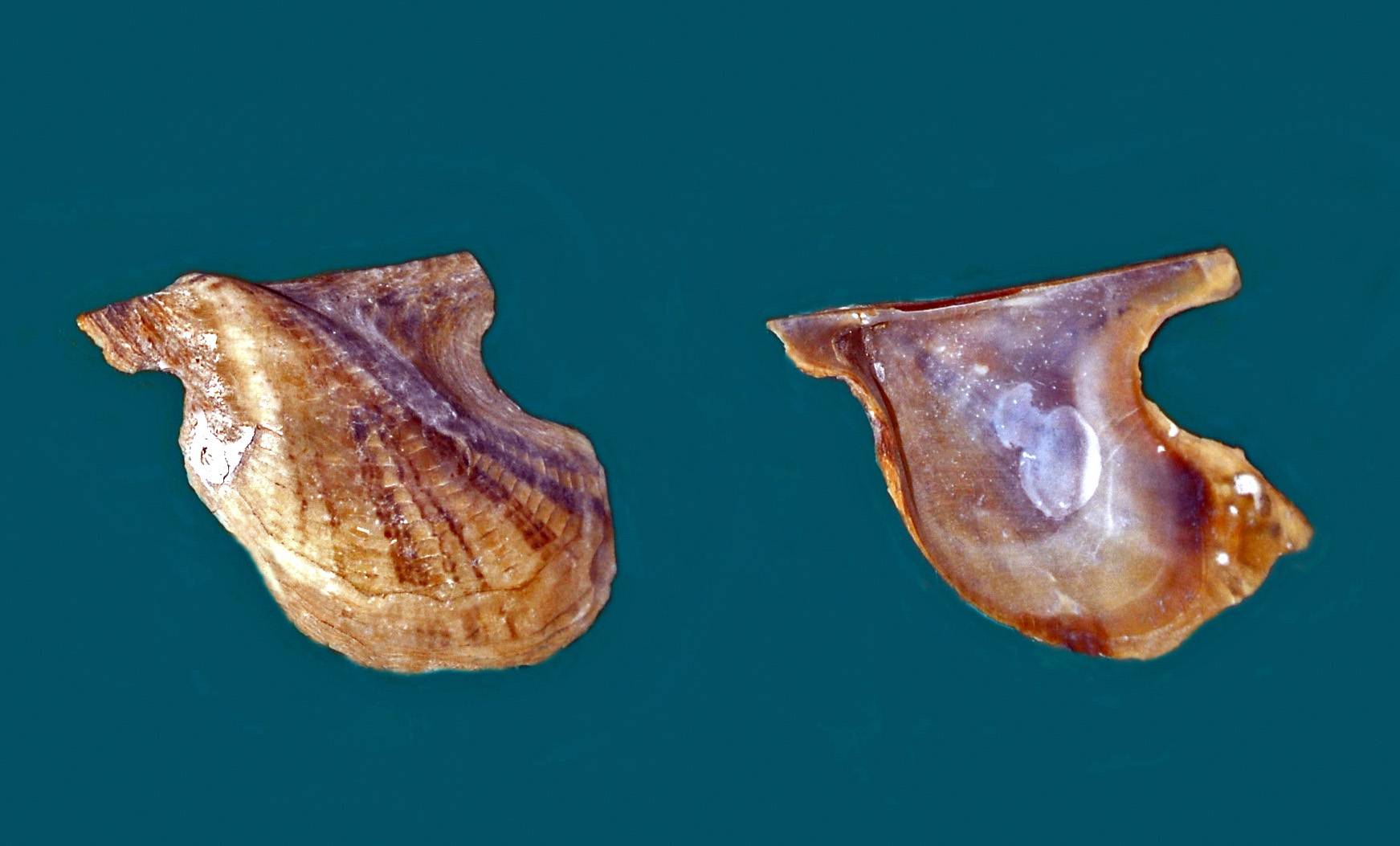
- A view of valves of Pteria peasei

Scientific classification
- Kingdom: Animalia
- Phylum: Mollusca
- Class: Bivalvia
- Order: Pteriida
- Family: Pteriidae
- Genus: Pteria
- Species: P. peasei

Binomial name
- Pteria peasei (Dunker, 1872)

Synonyms
- Pteria cypsellus (Dunker, 1872); Avicula radiata Pease, 1862; Avicula peasei Dunker, 1872

= Pteria peasei =

Species of bivalve

Pteria peasei, common name swift wing oyster, is a species of bivalve mollusc in the family Pteriidae.

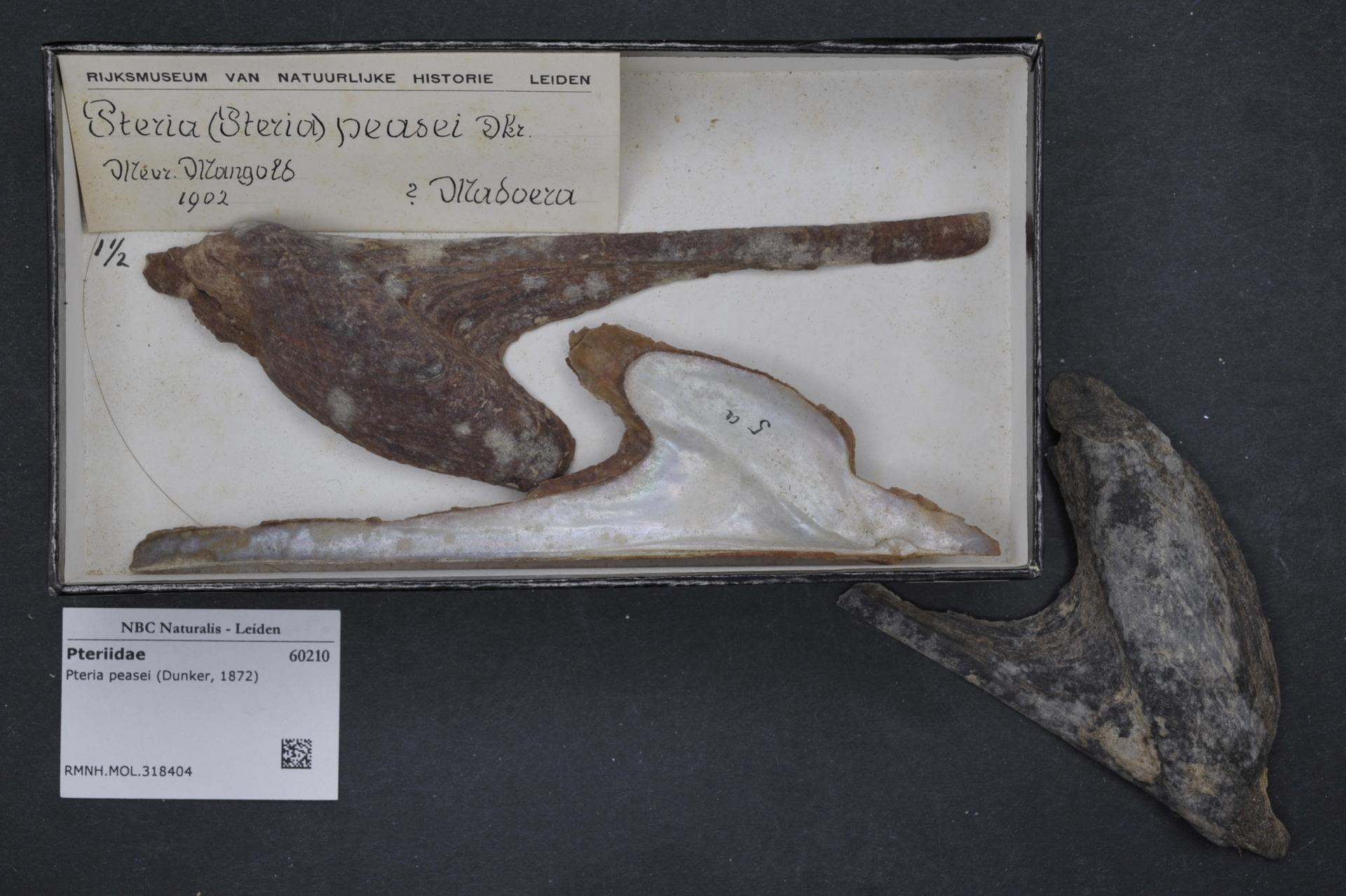
Pteria peasei

== Distribution ==
This species is present in the Indo-West Pacific from Myanmar to the Philippines; north to Japan and south to northern Australia.

== Description ==
Shells of Pteria peasei can reach a length of 13 centimetres (5.1 in).
