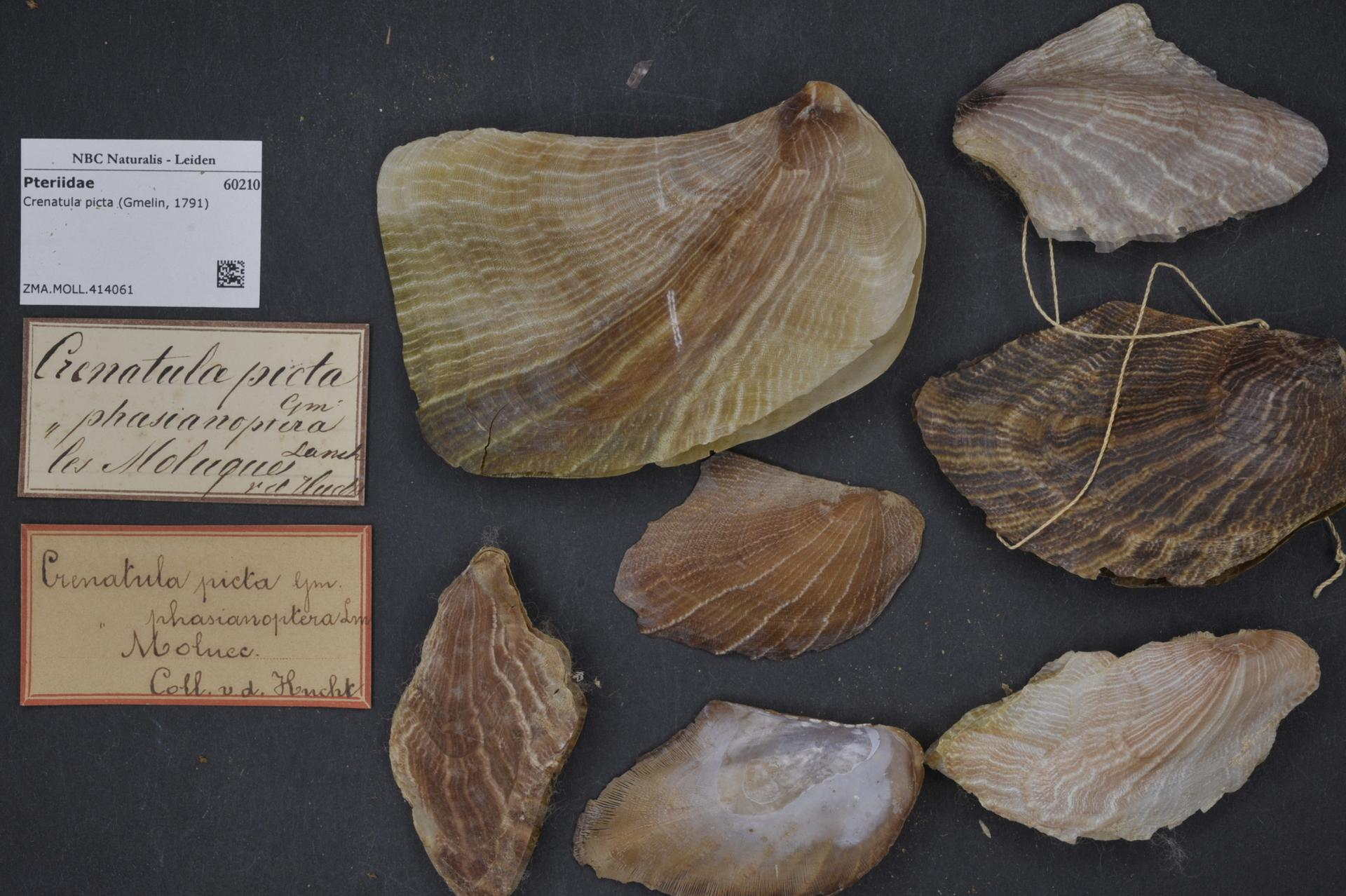

Scientific classification
- Kingdom: Animalia
- Phylum: Mollusca
- Class: Bivalvia
- Order: Pteriida
- Family: Pteriidae
- Genus: Crenatula
- Species: C. picta

Binomial name
- Crenatula picta (Gmelin, 1791)

Synonyms
- Crenatula elegans Philippi, 1851; Ostrea picta Gmelin, 1791

= Crenatula picta =

Species of bivalve

Crenatula picta is a species of marine bivalves in the family Pteriidae. The pteriomorph is known from Madagascar and the Red Sea.
