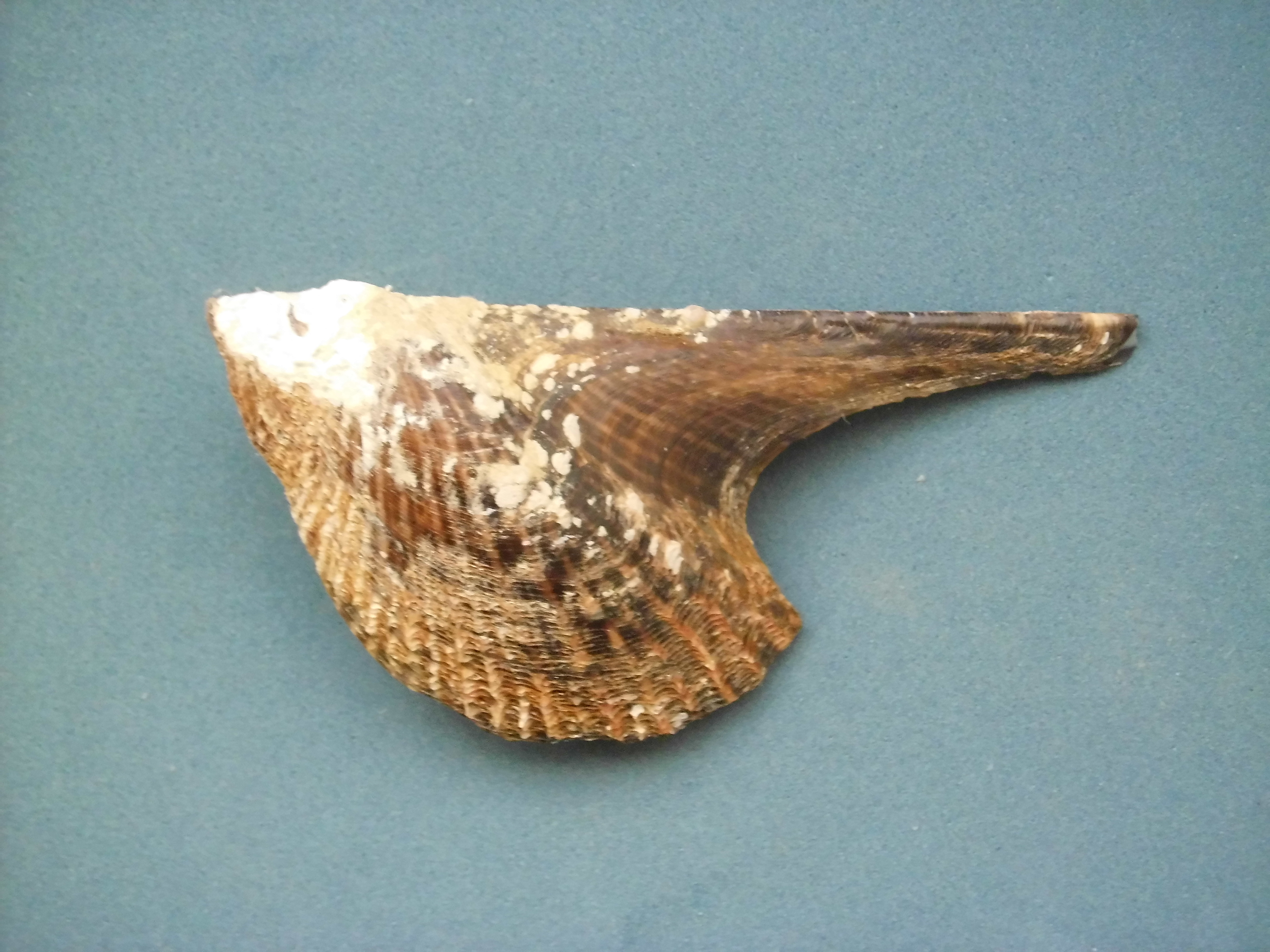

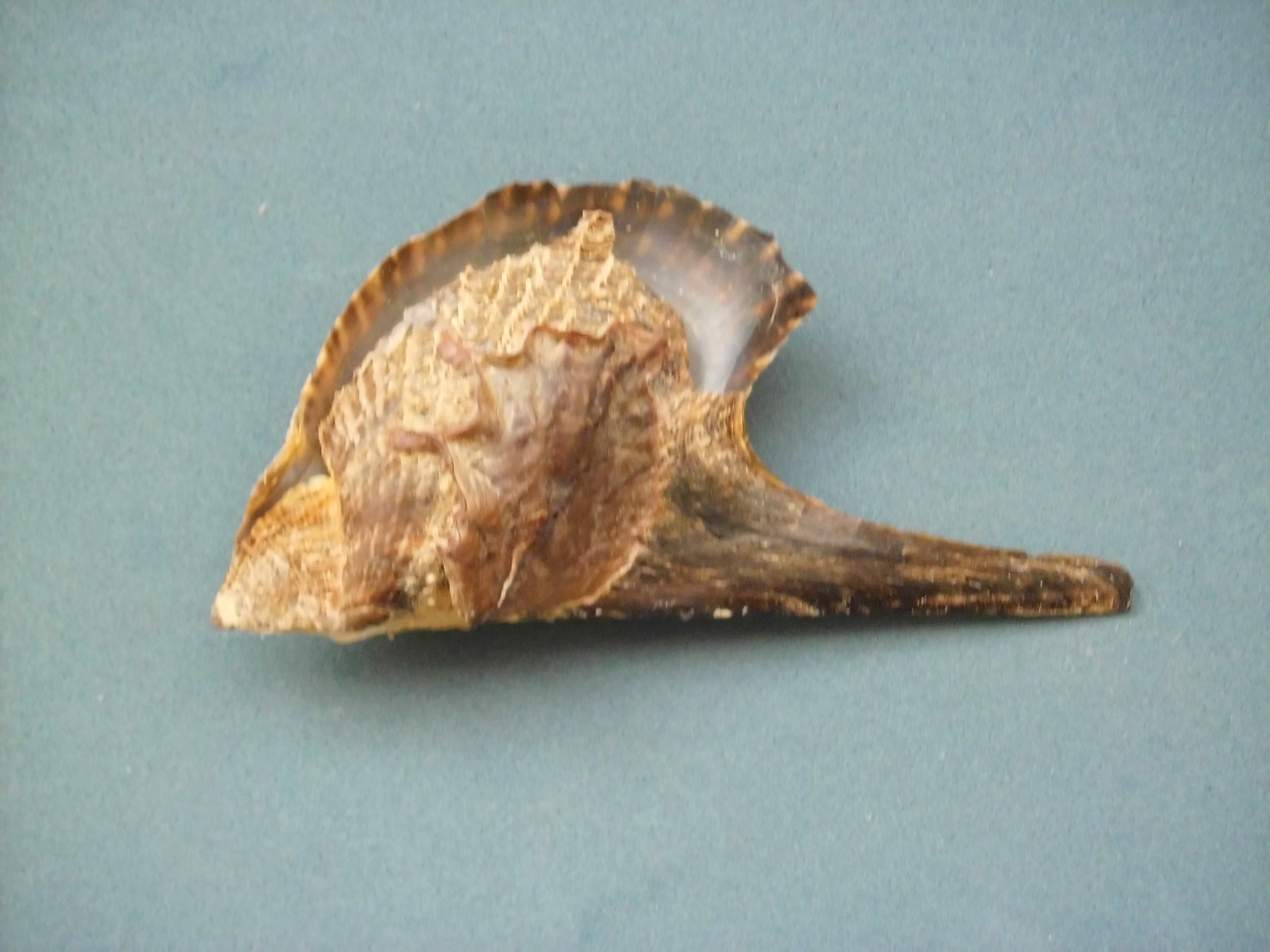

Conservation status
- Secure (NatureServe)

Scientific classification
- Kingdom: Animalia
- Phylum: Mollusca
- Class: Bivalvia
- Order: Pteriida
- Family: Pteriidae
- Genus: Pteria
- Species: P. colymbus

Binomial name
- Pteria colymbus (Roding, 1798)

Synonyms
- Avicula atlantica Lamarck, 1819; Avicula cornea Reeve, 1857; Avicula jamaicensis Dunker, 1879; Avicula nigrofusca Dunker, 1872; Pinctada colymbus Röding, 1798; Pteria atlantica (Lamarck, 1819)

= Pteria colymbus =

Species of bivalve

Pteria colymbus, the Atlantic winged oyster, is a species of bivalve mollusc in the family Pteriidae. It can be found along the Atlantic coast of North America, ranging from North Carolina to Bermuda and Brazil.

== Description ==
The Atlantic winged oyster grows to about 7 centimetres (2.8 in) long and is a distinctive, asymmetric shape. It has a long straight hinge with one wing drawn out a long way and the other one much smaller. The upper valve is brownish, often mottled with paler markings. The lower valve is flatter and smaller and the interior of the shell is pearly grey. The posterior margin is rounded while the anterior margin is elongated and slopes at an acute angle to the hinge. There are a number of indistinct, irregular ribs that flare out from the umbo. These are sparsely covered with blunt spines and there is a fine sculpturing of concentric growth lines.

== Distribution ==
The Atlantic winged oyster is found in the Western Atlantic at depths between 3 and 30 metres (10 to 100 feet). The range extends from North Carolina and Florida, southwards through the Caribbean Sea and the Gulf of Mexico to Venezuela and northern Brazil.

== Biology ==
The Atlantic winged oyster is often found attached to the stems of gorgonian corals by strong byssus threads. It often has algae and other organisms growing on the shell which make it well camouflaged. It is a filter feeder and is reproductively active all year round. The spat abundance varies and has four peaks in the period November to March. In El Niño years, there is increased rainfall in the Caribbean Sea which reduces the salinity, more sediment is stirred up from the substrate and there is greater run-off of nutrients from the land. These factors do not seem to impact adversely on recruitment of the oyster. A study was made on the coast of Venezuela to determine whether cultivation of this species was feasible. It was found that at some times of year the molluscs were stressed, perhaps by a lack of phytoplankton availability, and growth rates were too low for commercial exploitation to be worthwhile.

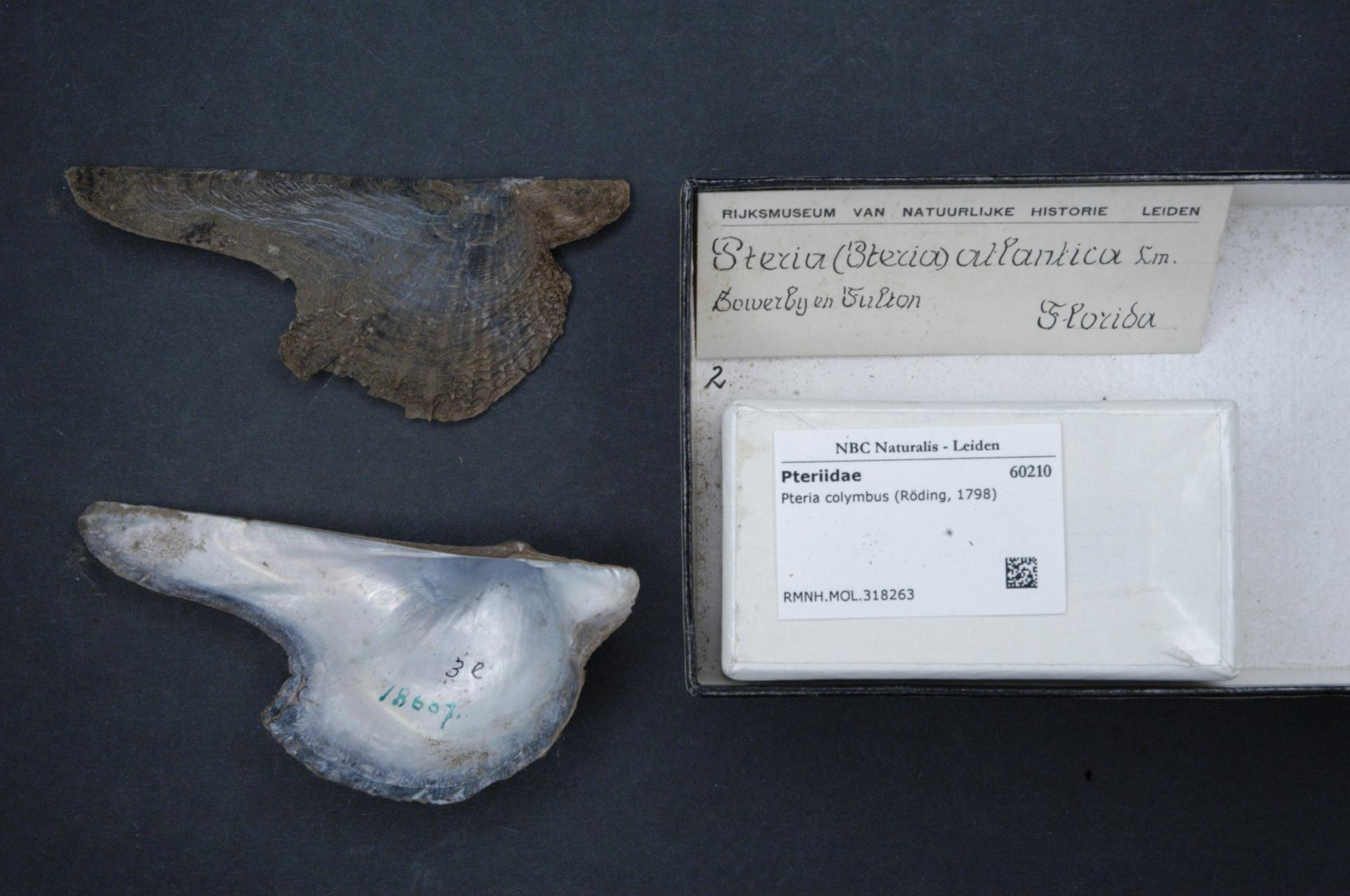
Pteria colymbus (Röding, 1798), museum specimens Naturalis
