= Vulsellidae =

Scientific classification
- Domain: Eukaryota
- Kingdom: Animalia
- Phylum: Mollusca
- Class: Bivalvia
- Order: Ostreida
- Family: Vulsellidae; Gray, 1854

Family of bivalves

Vulsellidae is a family of bivalves belonging to the order Ostreida.

Genera:

- Crenatula Lamarck, 1803
- Electroma Stoliczka, 1871
- Vulsella Röding, 1798
