= Vulsella =

Vulsella may refer to:

- Vulsella (bivalve), a genus of bivalves in the family Malleidae
- Vulsellum, a type of forceps
