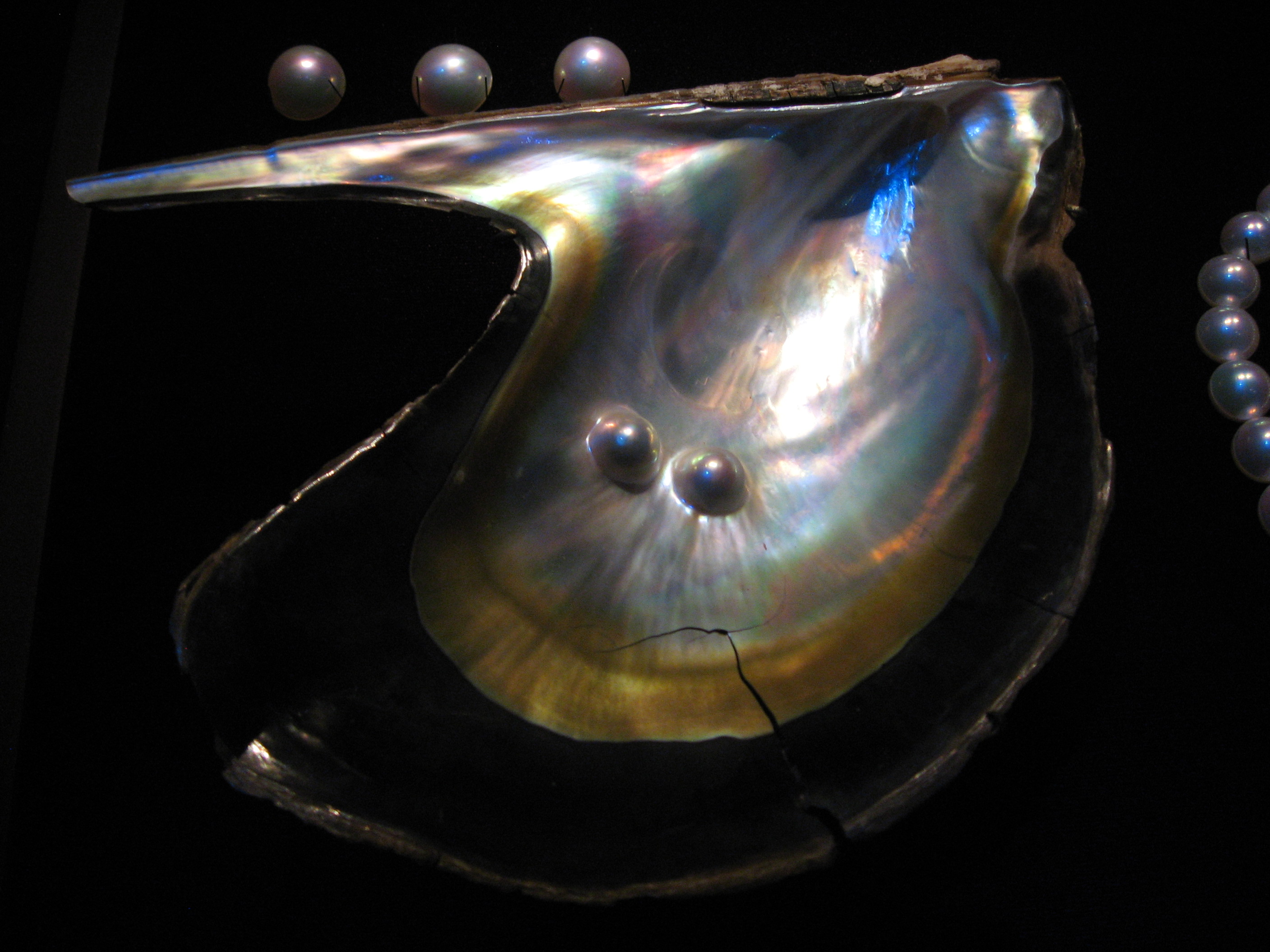
- Pteria penguin

Scientific classification
- Domain: Eukaryota
- Kingdom: Animalia
- Phylum: Mollusca
- Class: Bivalvia
- Order: Pteriida
- Family: Pteriidae
- Genus: Pteria; Scopoli, 1777

Synonyms
- Austropteria Iredale, 1939; Avicula Bruguière, 1792; Electroma (Pterelectroma) Iredale, 1939; Magnavicula Iredale, 1939; Phelopteria Stephenson, 1953

= Pteria (bivalve) =

Pteria Temporal range: Triassic–Recent

Genus of bivalves

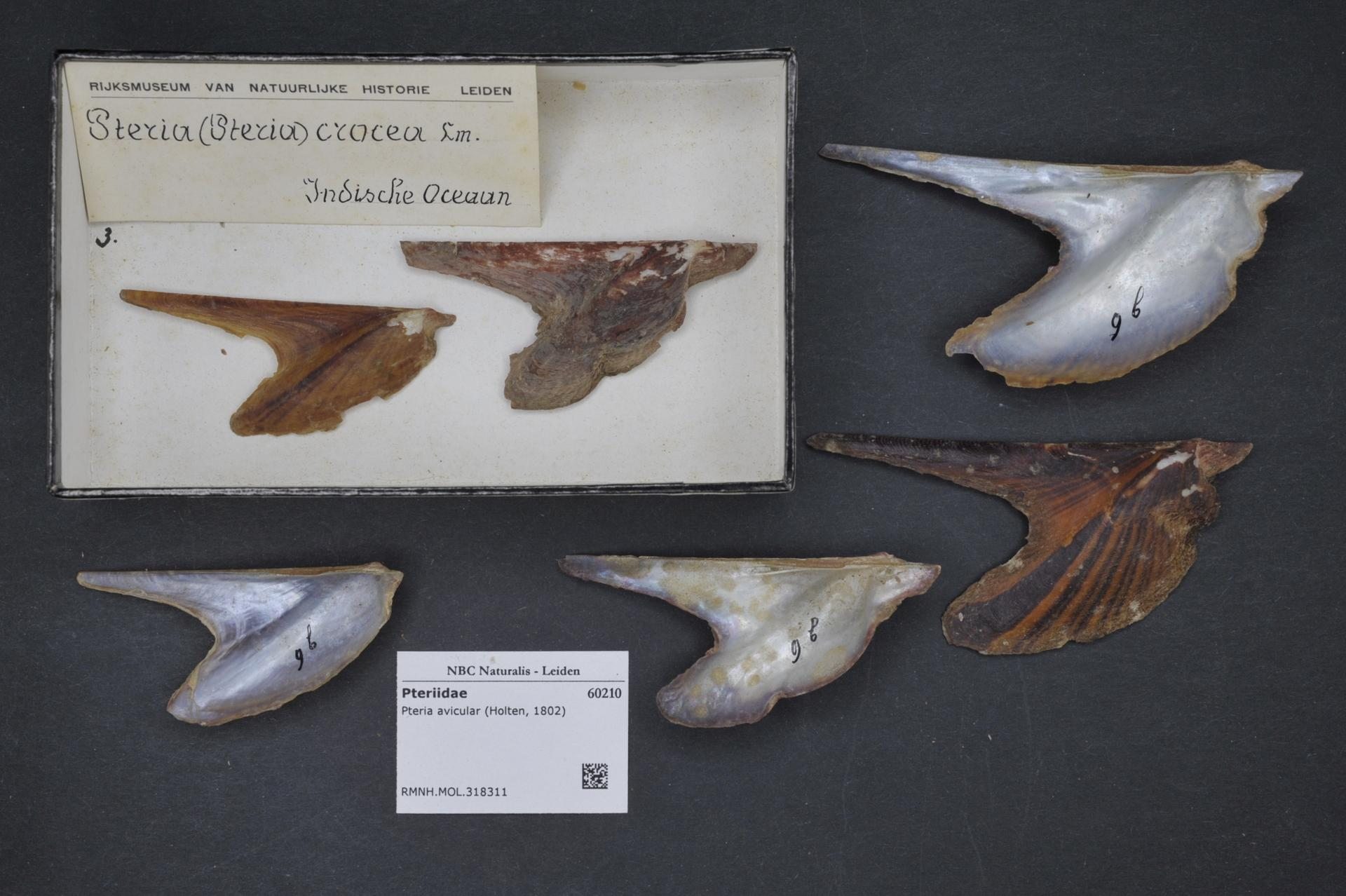
Pteria avicular (Holten, 1802), museum specimens Naturalis

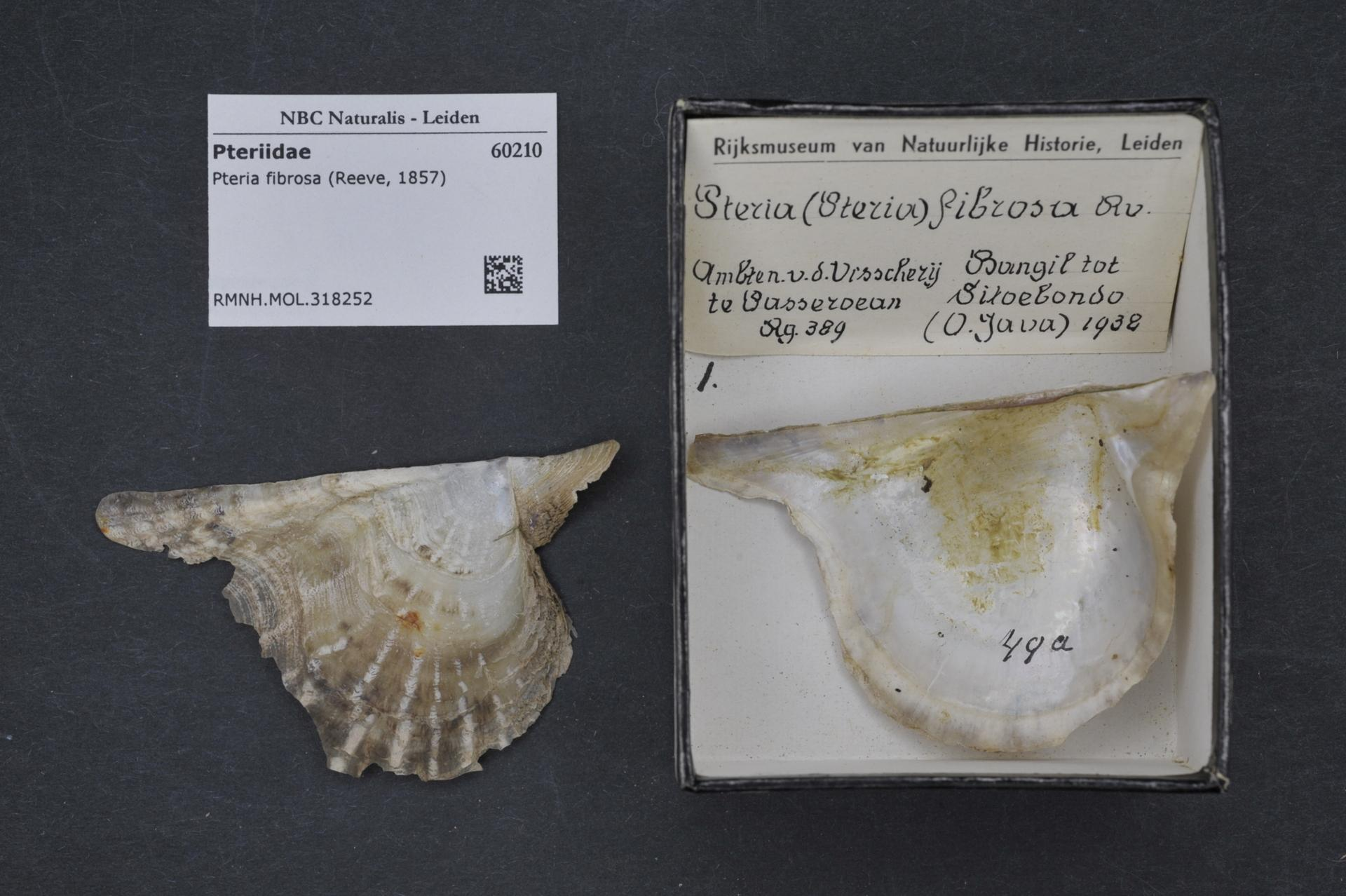
Pteria fibrosa (Reeve, 1857), museum specimens Naturalis

Pteria is a genus of molluscs in the family Pteriidae. The species of the genus are sometimes referred to as wing-oysters or winged oysters.

== Selected species ==
The World Register of Marine Species includes the following species in the genus:

- Pteria admirabilis Wang, 2002
- Pteria aegyptiaca (Dillwyn, 1817)
- Pteria atlantica (Lamarck, 1819)
- Pteria avicular (Holten, 1802)
- Pteria bernhardi (Iredale, 1939)
- Pteria broomei Huber, 2010
- Pteria brunnea (Pease, 1863)
- Pteria bulliformis Wang, 2002
- Pteria colymbus (Roding, 1798) — Atlantic wing-oyster
- Pteria cooki Lamprell & Healy, 1997
- Pteria dendronephthya Habe, 1960
- Pteria fibrosa (Reeve, 1857)
- Pteria formosa (Reeve, 1857)
- Pteria gregata (Reeve, 1857)
- Pteria heteroptera (Lamarck, 1819)
- Pteria hirundo Linnaeus, 1758
- Pteria howensis Lamprell & Healy, 1997
- Pteria lata (Gray in Eyre, 1845)
- Pteria levitata (Iredale, 1939)
- Pteria maccullochi (Iredale, 1939)
- Pteria maura (Reeve, 1857)
- Pteria peasei (Dunker, 1872) ‒ swift wing oyster
- Pteria penguin (Röding, 1798) — Penguin's wing oyster
- Pteria saltata (Iredale, 1931)
- Pteria spectrum (Reeve, 1857)
- Pteria sterna Gould, 1851 — Pacific wing-oyster
- Pteria straminea (Dunker, 1852)
- Pteria tortirostris (Dunker, 1849)
- Pteria venezuelensis (Dunker, 1872)

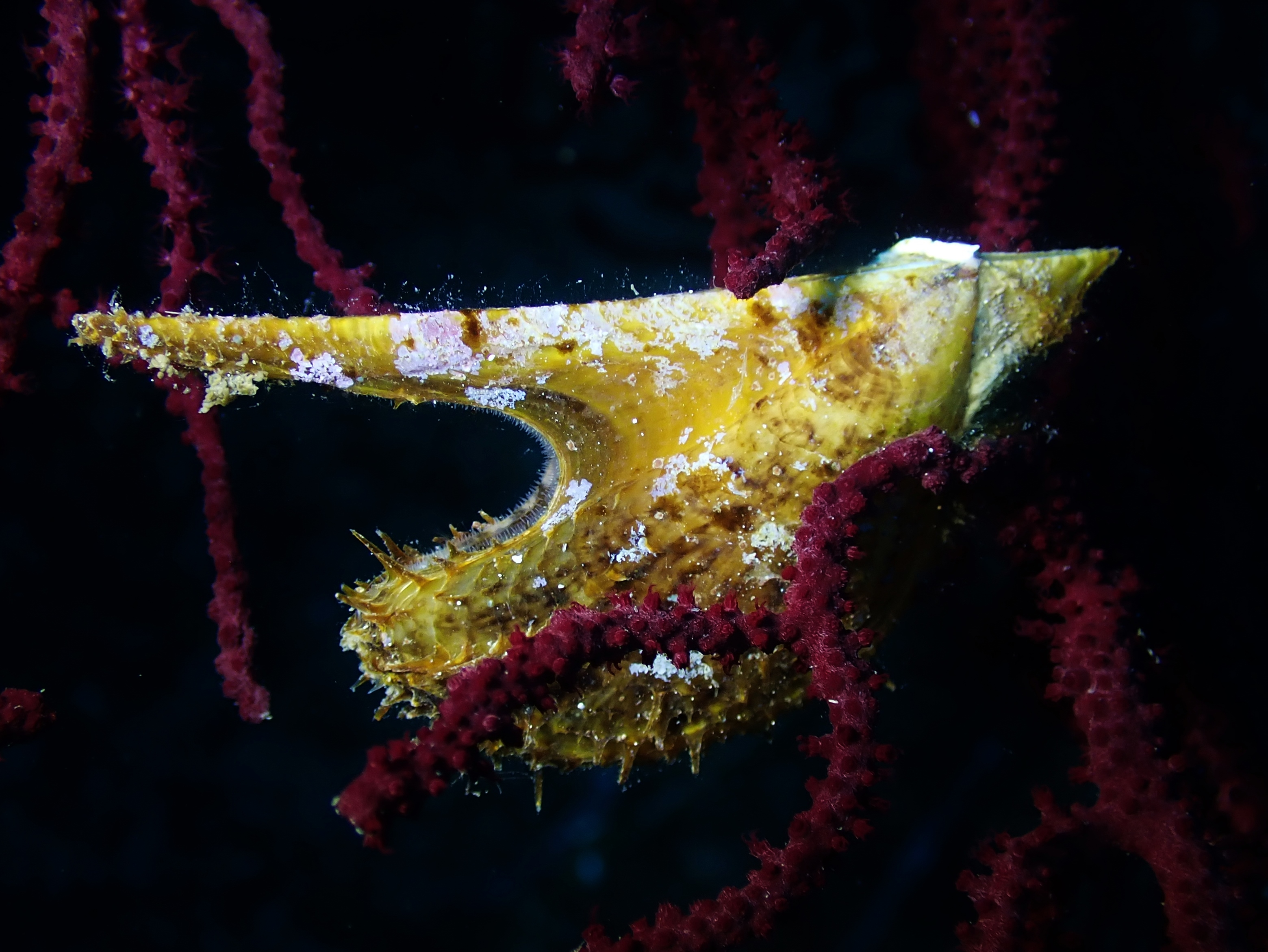
Pteria hirundo in situ.
