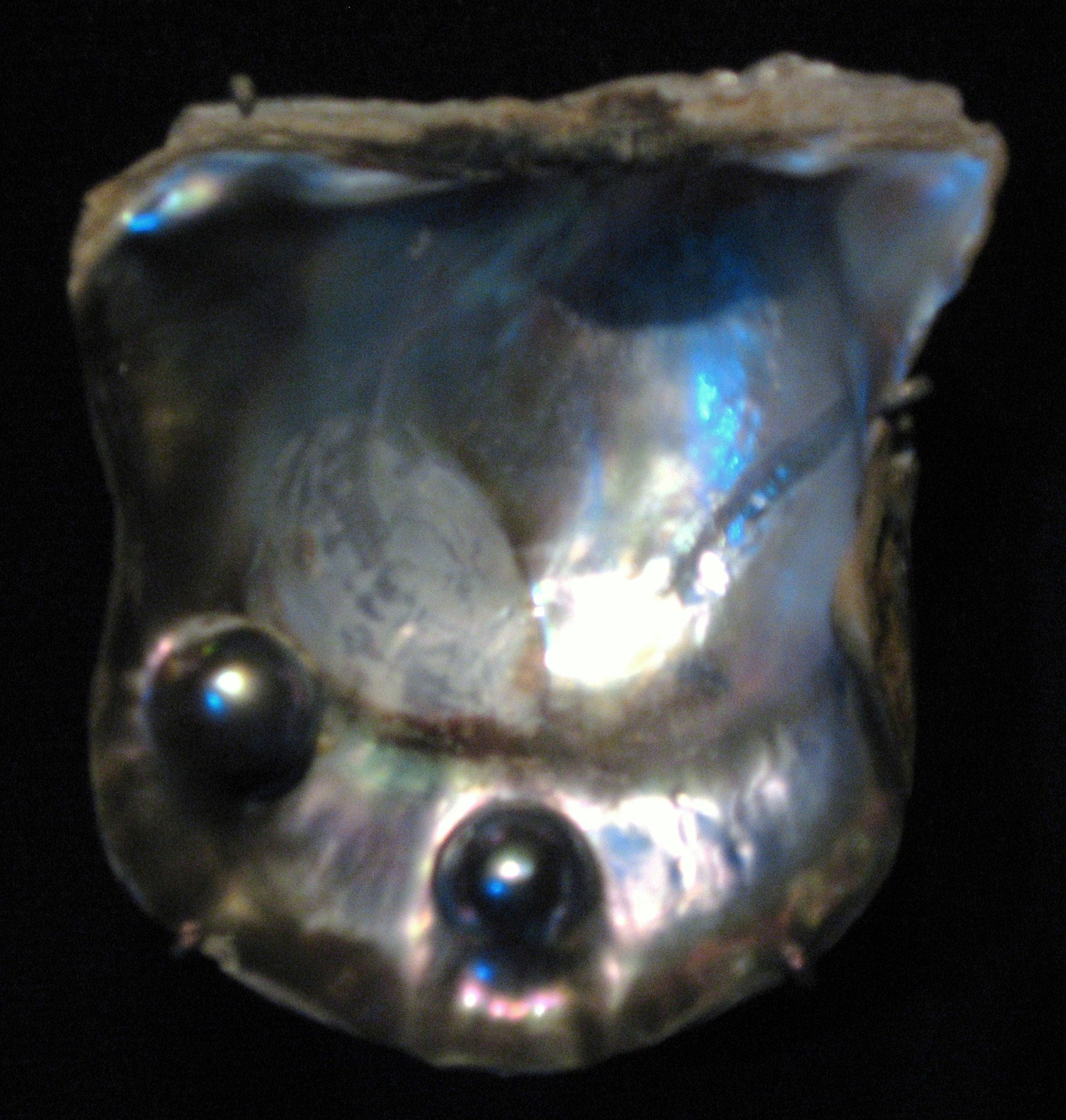
- Pteria sterna with pearls

Scientific classification
- Kingdom: Animalia
- Phylum: Mollusca
- Class: Bivalvia
- Order: Pteriida
- Family: Pteriidae
- Genus: Pteria
- Species: P. sterna

Binomial name
- Pteria sterna (Gould, 1851)

Synonyms
- Avicula fimbriata Dunker, 1852; Avicula eximia Reeve, 1857; Avicula libella Reeve, 1857; Avicula peruviana Reeve, 1857; Avicula sterna Gould, 1851; Avicula vivesi Rochebrune, 1895; Pteria beiliana Olsson, 1961; Pteria rositae Hertlein, 1928

= Pteria sterna =

Species of bivalve

Pteria sterna, or commonly known as the rainbow-lipped pearl oyster or the Pacific wing-oyster, is a species of marine bivalve mollusk in the family Pteriidae, the pearl oysters. This oyster can be found in shallow water along the tropical and subtropical Pacific coast of America, its range including Baja California, Mexico and northern Peru.

== History ==
Fragments of shell ornaments made from the nacre of the Pacific wing-oyster have been found at ancient burial sites in Mexico, probably belonging to the indigenous Seri people of the Sonora region. This oyster has been the subject of a pearl fishery in the Gulf of California since before the arrival of Hernan Cortez in 1535; the Spaniards quickly appreciated the value of the harvest and in 1586 they declared the gathering of oysters to be a right of the Spanish crown. In 1874, compressed air diving equipment made harvesting the oysters easier. Over-exploitation caused populations of the oyster to become depleted and in 1940 the fishery was closed by the Mexican Government, a ban that still remains in force.

== Distribution ==
Pteria sterna is found in shallow water along the tropical and subtropical Pacific coast of America. Its range includes Baja California, Mexico and the Talara Province of northern Peru where its depth range is 2.6 to 20 m (8.5 to 65.6 ft).

== Pearl culture ==
The Pacific wing-oyster naturally produces gray, pink, golden, green and purplish pearls. With the dwindling of the number of wild oysters, efforts to farm this species on a commercial scale to produce pearls have been made. The production of cultured pearls requires the grafting of a pearl nucleus, together with a portion of mantle tissue from a donor into a recipient oyster. The culture of round pearls in Pacific wing-oysters is technically hard; the oysters are small and the shells are thin, the shape of the shell makes the seeding operation difficult and the pearl sack is wide at the base which means that the graft may shift around. With experience, technicians gain expertise in seeding and yields can be high, with pearls reaching a maximum of 12 mm (0.5 in) in diameter.
