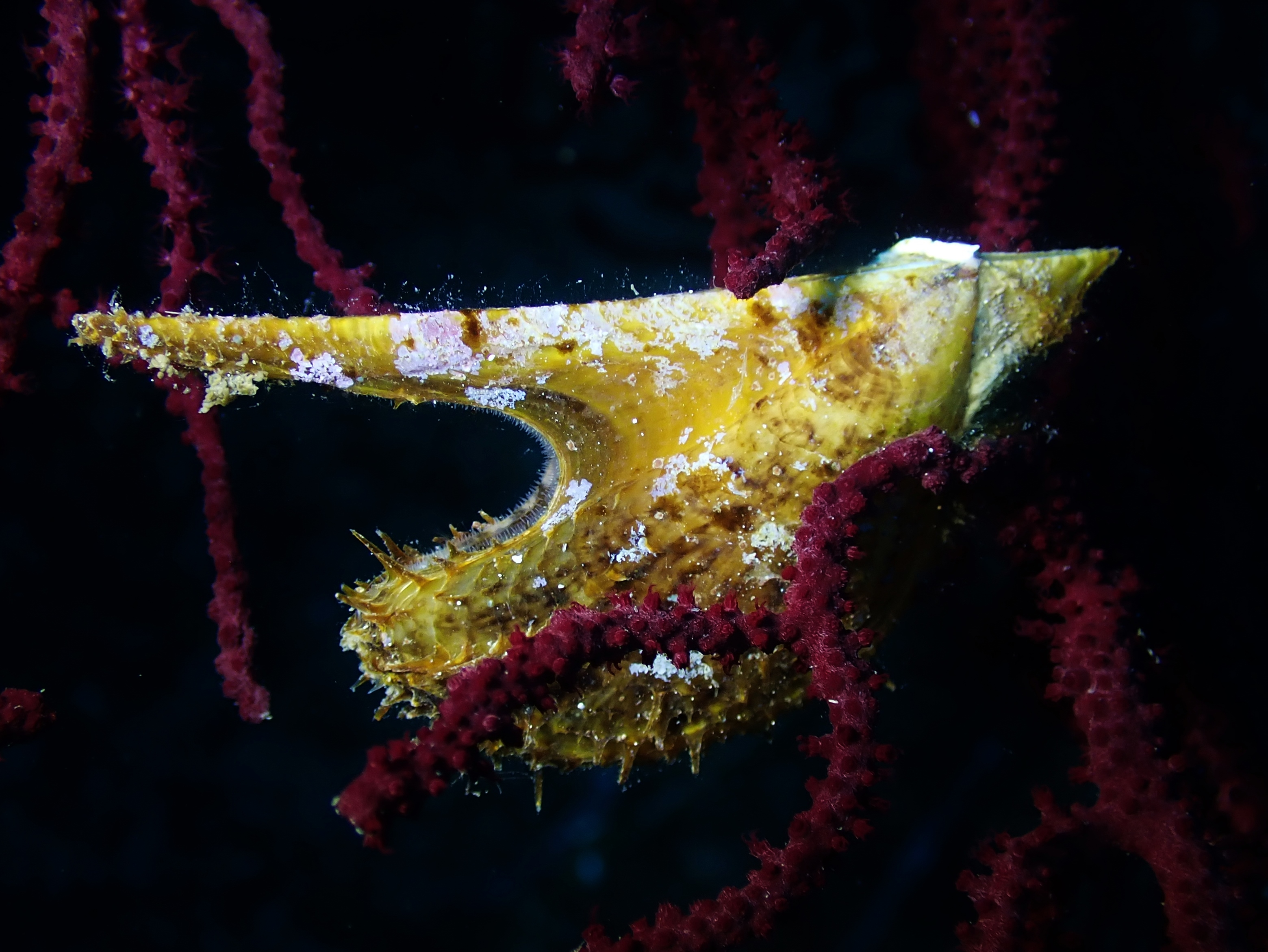

Scientific classification
- Kingdom: Animalia
- Phylum: Mollusca
- Class: Bivalvia
- Order: Pteriida
- Family: Pteriidae
- Genus: Pteria
- Species: P. hirundo

Binomial name
- Pteria hirundo (Linnaeus, 1758)

= Pteria hirundo =

Species of bivalve

Pteria hirundo is a species of bivalve belonging to the family Pteriidae.

The species is found in Europe, Africa and the Americas.

Right and left valve of the same specimen:

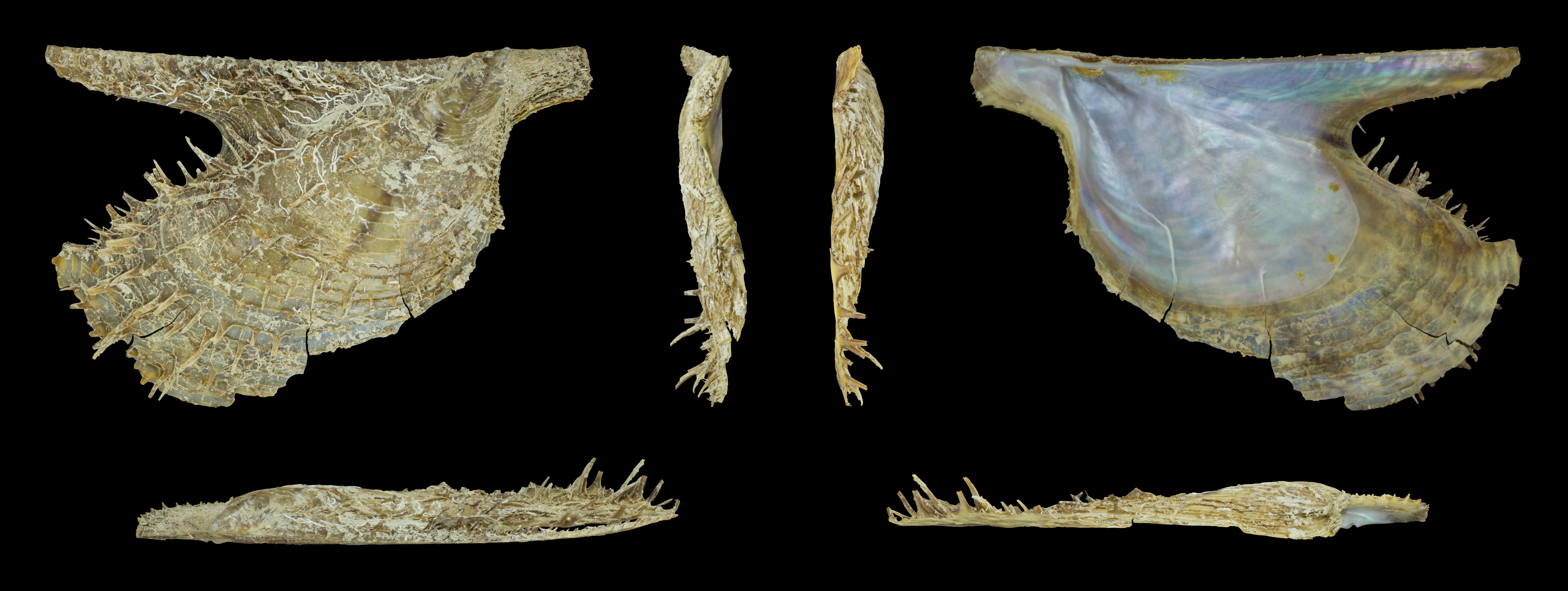
Right valve

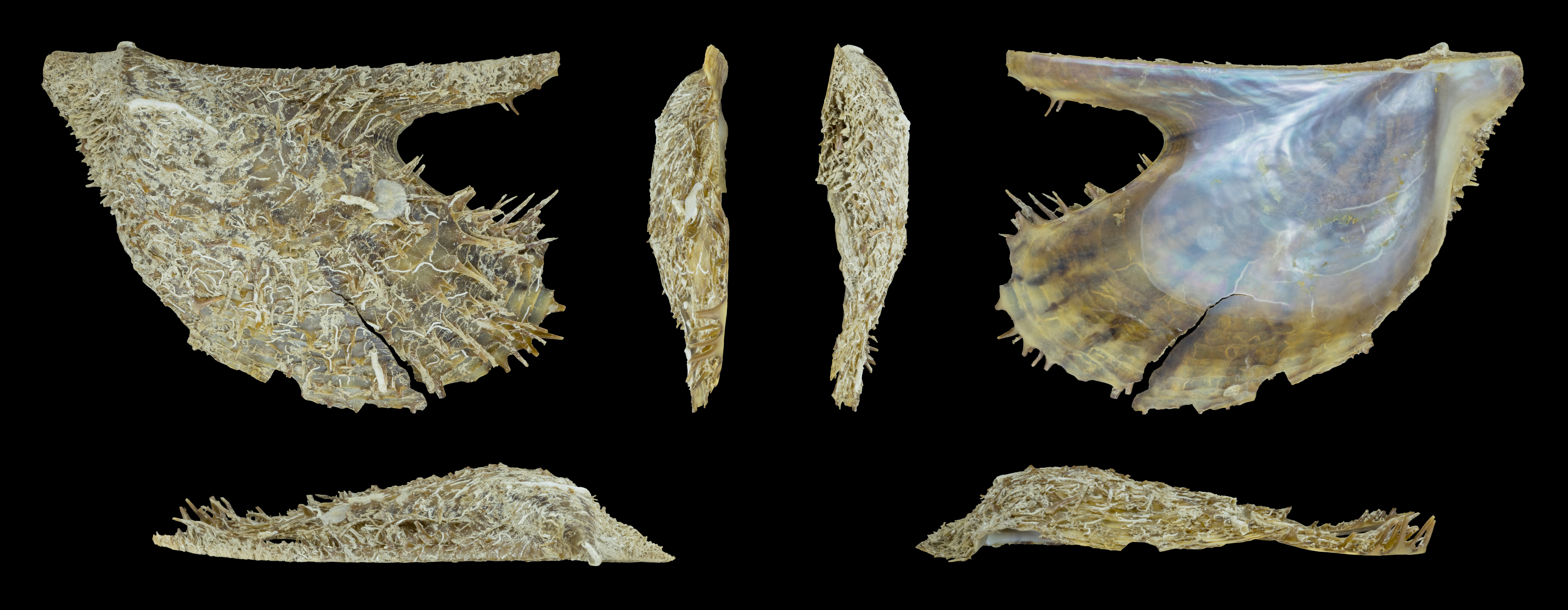
Left valve
