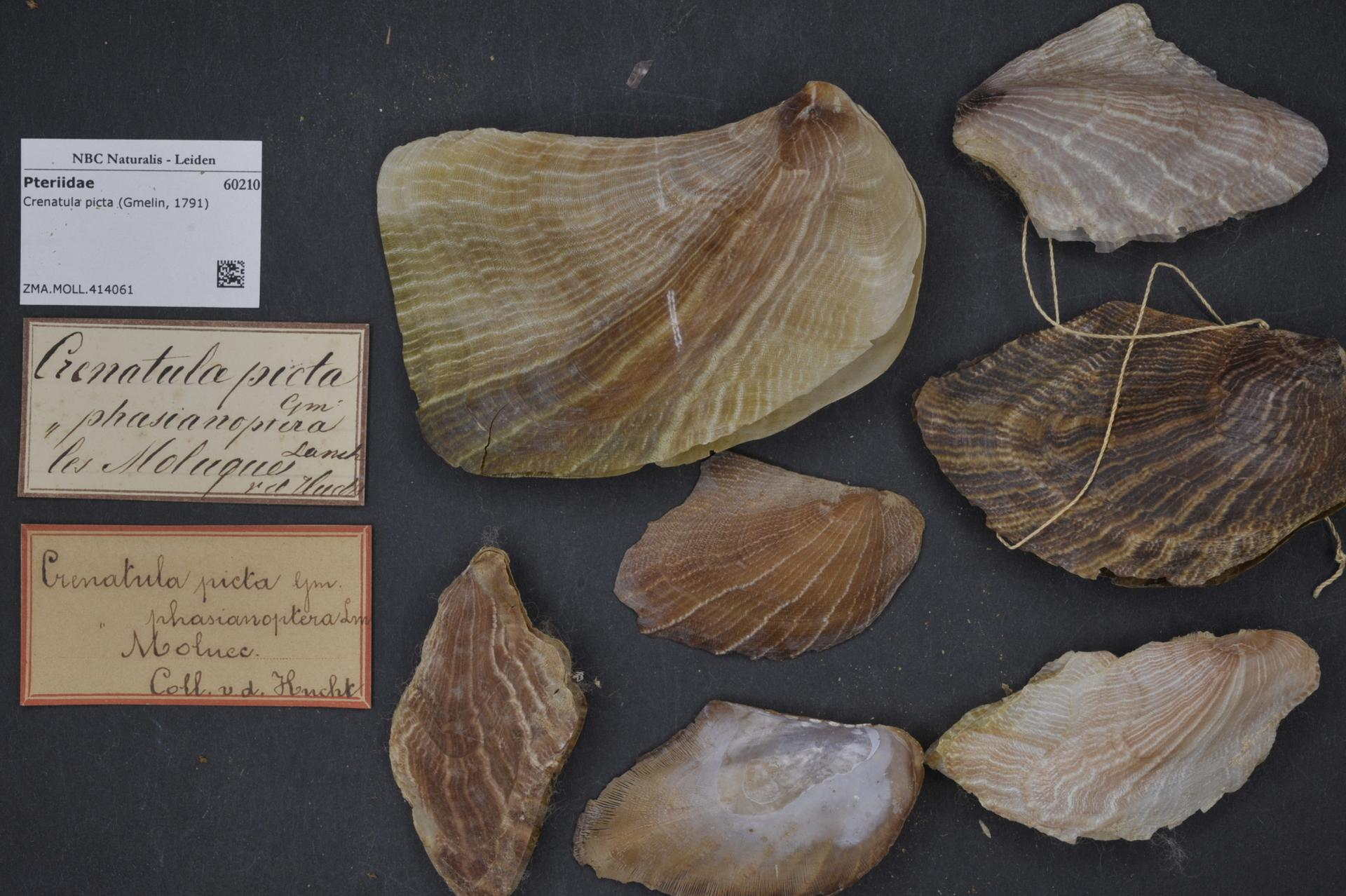
- Crenatula picta

Scientific classification
- Domain: Eukaryota
- Kingdom: Animalia
- Phylum: Mollusca
- Class: Bivalvia
- Order: Pteriida
- Family: Pteriidae
- Genus: Crenatula; Lamarck, 1803

Species
- Crenatula avicularis F. Stoliczka, 1871; Crenatula flammea L. A. Reeve, 1858; Crenatula modiolaris J. B. Lamarck, 1819; Crenatula nakayamai T. Kuroda & T. Habe, 1961; Crenatula nigrina J. B. Lamarck, 1819; Crenatula picta (Gmelin, 1791)

Synonyms
- Dalacia Gray, 1825

= Crenatula =

Genus of bivalves

Crenatula is a genus in the family Pteriidae.
