= Vulsella (bivalve) =

Scientific classification
- Domain: Eukaryota
- Kingdom: Animalia
- Phylum: Mollusca
- Class: Bivalvia
- Order: Ostreida
- Family: Vulsellidae
- Genus: Vulsella; Röding, 1798

Genus of molluscs

Vulsella is a genus of bivalves belonging to the family Vulsellidae.

The genus has almost cosmopolitan distribution.

Species:

- Vulsella angusta Deshayes, 1858
- Vulsella clarki Vokes, 1939
- Vulsella deperdita Lamarck, 1819
- Vulsella fornicata (Forsskål, 1775)
- Vulsella grandicubitus Eames, 1951
- Vulsella laevigata Tate, 1886
- Vulsella legumen (d'Archiac & Haime, 1854)
- Vulsella margaritacea Risso, 1826
- Vulsella minor Röding, 1798
- Vulsella ovata Lamarck, 1819
- Vulsella pakistanica Eames, 1951
- Vulsella rugosa Lamarck, 1819
- Vulsella vulsella (Linnaeus, 1758)
