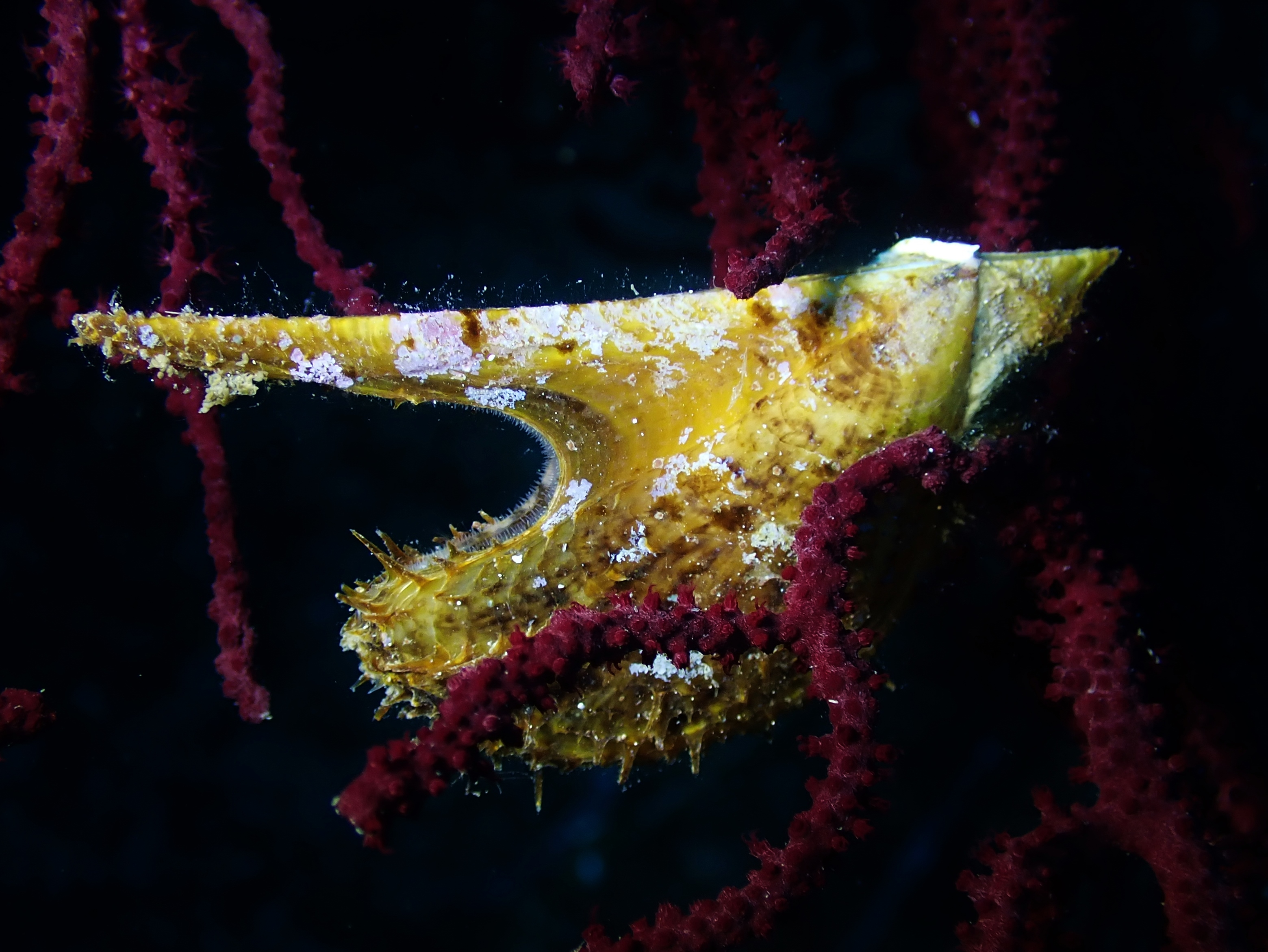
- A live individual of Pteria hirundo

Scientific classification
- Kingdom: Animalia
- Phylum: Mollusca
- Class: Bivalvia
- Order: Pteriida
- Superfamily: Pterioidea
- Family: Pteriidae; Gray, 1847

Genera
- See text

= Pteriidae =

Feather oysters

Family of molluscs

Pteriidae, also called the feather oysters, is a family of medium-sized to large saltwater oysters. They are pearl oysters, marine bivalve mollusks in the order Pteriida.

Some of the species in this family are important economically as the source of saltwater pearls.

== Genera ==
Genera in the family Pteriidae include:

- Crenatula Lamarck, 1803
- Electroma Stoliczka, 1871
- Pinctada Röding, 1798
- Pteria Scopoli, 1777 - winged oysters
- Vulsella Röding, 1798
