= List of pearls by size =

Lists of smallest to biggest pearls

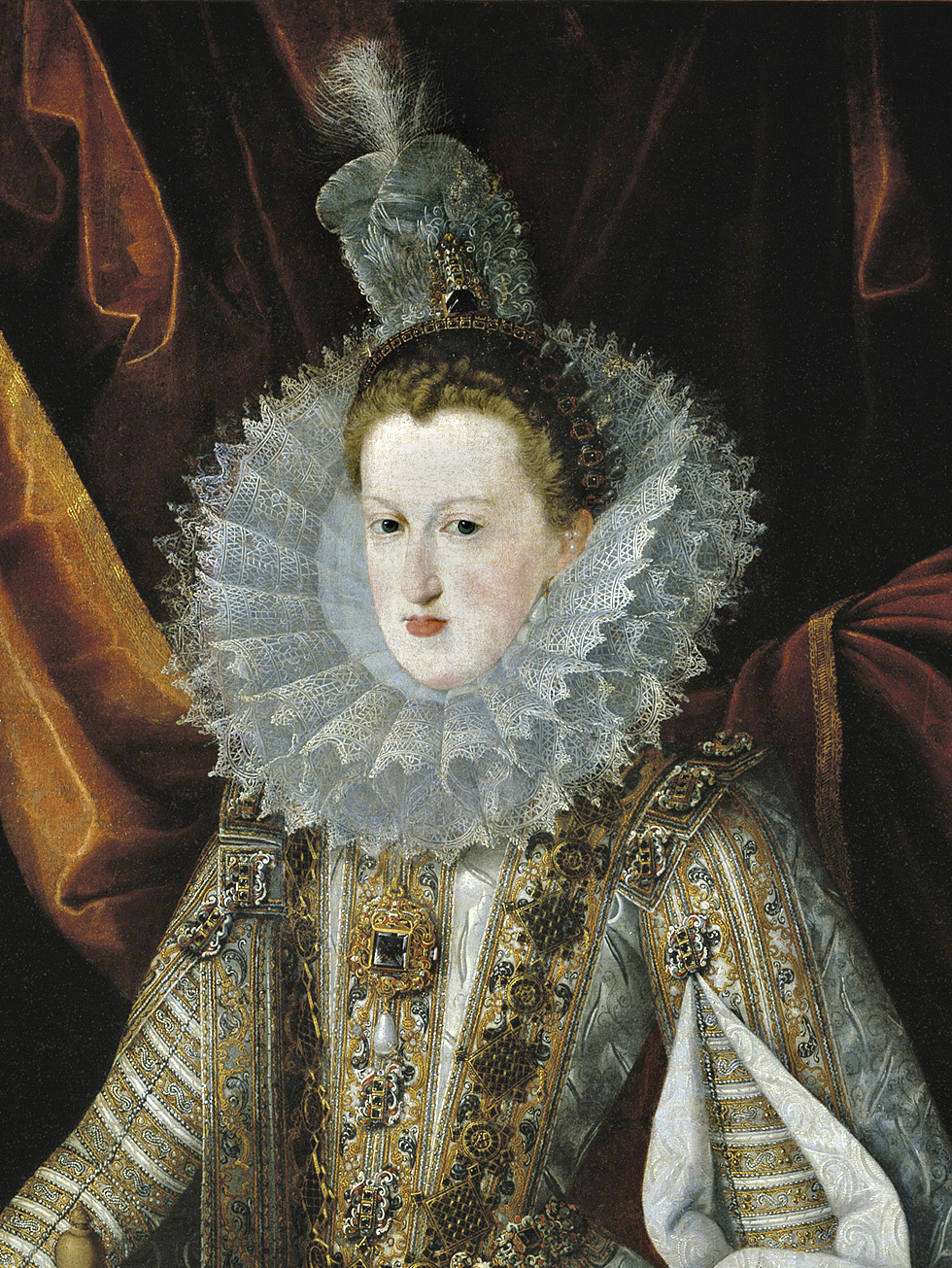
Juan Pantoja de la Cruz, Margaret of Austria, Queen of Spain wearing the La Peregrina pearl (c. 1606)

Pearls are a valuable gemstone and come in a number of sizes. This is a list of the biggest pearls.

== Context ==
A pearl is a hard, glistening object produced within the soft tissue (specifically the mantle) of a living shelled mollusk or another animal, such as a conulariid. Just like the shell of a mollusk, a pearl is composed of calcium carbonate (mainly aragonite or a mixture of aragonite and calcite) in minute crystalline form, which has been deposited in concentric layers. The ideal pearl is perfectly round and smooth, but many other shapes, known as baroque pearl can occur.

The finest quality of natural pearls have been highly valued as gemstones and objects of beauty for many centuries. Because of this, pearl has become a metaphor for something rare, fine, admirable and valuable. The most valuable pearls occur spontaneously in the wild, but are extremely rare. These wild pearls are referred to as natural pearls. Cultured or farmed pearls from pearl oysters and freshwater mussels make up the majority of those currently sold. Whether wild or cultured, gem-quality pearls are almost always nacreous and iridescent, like the interior of the shell that produces them. However, almost all species of shelled mollusks are capable of producing pearls (technically "calcareous concretions") of lesser shine or less spherical shape.

There is a lot of myth and legend surrounding some of these pearls. The Pearl of Lao Tzu for a long time thought to be the largest pearl, but claims about its size and much of its history were found to be fabricated by a conman by the name of Victor Barbish. Other pearls like the Centaur Pearl, most likely the largest gem pearl at 856.58 carats (171.316 g), have just recently emerged from private collections.

== List ==
Name	Origin	Date	Color	Carat	Weight	Height	Length	Width	Notes	Refs
Centaur Pearl		2000	White (Note: Mauve, lavender, gray and bronze overtones with intense iridescence)	856.58 carats (171.316 g)			114.3 mm (4.50 in)	48.51 mm (1.910 in) (Note: Circumference is 152.4 mm (6.00 in) at its widest)	(Note: Discovered in an antique sculpture of a centaur)	
Burma Pearl		2000	White	845 carats (169.0 g)						
Abalone pearl	United States	May 31, 2010	White	718.50 carats (143.700 g)		14 cm (5.5 in)	8 cm (3.1 in)	4 cm (1.6 in)	(Note: Found by Dat Vi Truong in Mendocino, California, USA)	
Pearl of Asia	Oman	1628	White	605 carats (121.0 g)					(Note: Shah Jahan gave it to his wife Mumtaz Mahal of Taj Mahal fame. Later Persian Nadir Shah looted it and gave to Manchu emperor of China Qianlong and was buried with him. During Boxer Rebellion it was looted and in 1918 was sold to a French Father Souvay. Stolen in 1944 from Paris but later recovered.)	
Arco Valley Pearl			White (Note: Pink and yellow overtones)	575 carats (115.0 g)		79 mm (3.1 in)	41 mm (1.6 in)	34 mm (1.3 in)	(Note: Mongolian emperor Khubilai Khan reportedly gave it to Marco Polo)	
Hope Pearl			White (Note: Grading from a dark bronze to white)	450 carats (90 g) (Note: 1800 grains)			50.8 mm (2.00 in)	30.32 to 36.38 mm (1.194 to 1.432 in) (Note: Circumfrance ranges from 95.25 mm (3.750 in) to 114.3 mm (4.50 in))	(Note: Owned by collector Henry Philip Hope)	
La Peregrina pearl	Panama	1513 (Note: Sources claim a slave discovered the pearl but at the time no slaves were in the region)	White	50.56 carats (10.112 g) (Note: 202.24 grains) (Note: Other sources list it as 55.95 carats (11.190 g) 223.8 grains)		17.35 mm (0.683 in)	17.90 mm (0.705 in)	5.50 mm (0.217 in)	(Note: Elizabeth Taylor set the pearl in a necklace that she sold for $8.8 million in 2011 (US$ 12,600,000 in 2025).)	
Giga Pearl	Philippines	1959	White (Note: White and cream-coloured)	138,250 carats	27.65 kg (61.0 lb)	393.7 mm (15.5 in)	228.6 mm (9 in)	209.5 mm (8.25 in)	(Note: Owned by a Mississauga, Ontario, man Abraham Reyes's family since 1959)	
Pearl of Lao Tzu	Philippines	1934	White	127,574 pearl grains	6.4 kg (14 lb)	24 cm (9.4 in)	24 cm (9.4 in)	24 cm (9.4 in)	(Note: It is not considered a gemstone pearl, but is instead known as a "clam pearl" or "Tridacna pearl" from a giant clam)	
Pearl of Puerto	Philippines	1996	White	170,000 carats	34 kg (75 lb)		67 cm (26 in)	30 cm (12 in)		
Sleeping Lion	China	1765	White		119 grams (4.2 oz)		6.858 cm (2.700 in)		(Note: Is the world’s largest freshwater pearl and in 2018 sold for $374,000 at auction in the Hague, Netherlands)	

== See also ==
- List of gold nuggets by size
- Servilia's pearl
