= Pearl of the Philippines =

Pearl of the Philippines may refer to:

- Pearl of Lao Tzu, the largest known pearl in the world; found in the Palawan sea
- Mutya ng Pilipinas, a beauty pageant held annually in the Philippines

== Places ==
- Boracay, a small island in the Philippines
- Puerto Galera
- Tawi-Tawi, sometimes called the "southernmost pearl of the Philippines".
