= Giga Pearl =

Largest non-nacreous pearl in the world

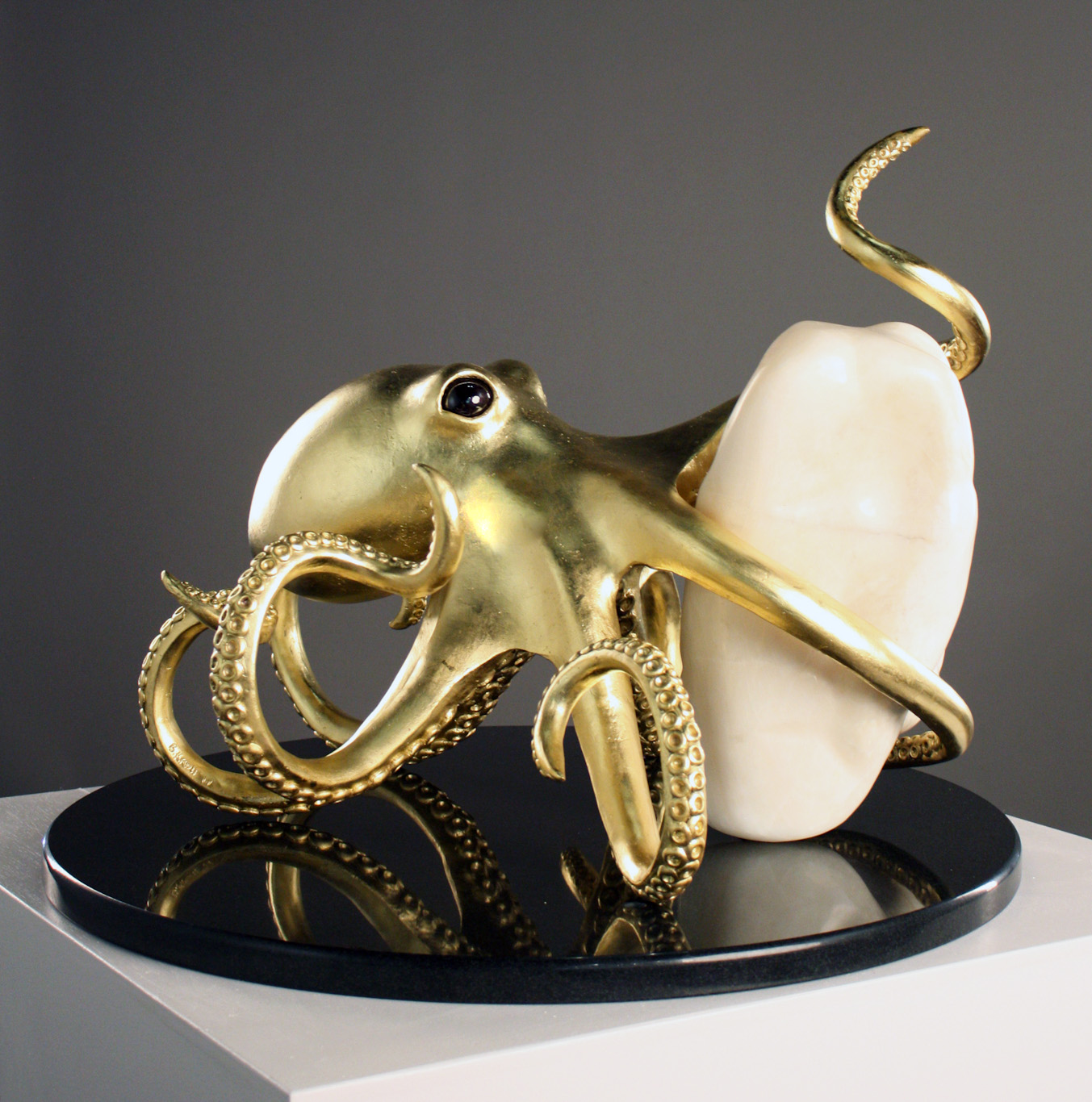
The Giga Pearl wrapped in the embrace of a gilded octopus sculpture.

The Giga Pearl holds the Guinness World Record as the largest certified pearl in the world. The pearl weighs in at 27.65 kg (60 lb 15 oz) and measures 39.37 cm × 22.86 cm × 20.95 cm (15.50 in × 9.00 in × 8.25 in), which is more than four times the mass of the Pearl of Lao Tzu (formerly the Pearl of Allah) which weighs 6.4 kg. There have been other claims of "the world's largest pearl" in recent years, but only the Giga Pearl is certified by the GIA (Gemological Institute of America) as the world's largest natural blister pearl, an indisputable claim.

== Origin ==
The Giga Pearl is owned by Abraham Reyes, a natural pearl and antiquities collector in Canada, whose great-aunt collected Asian artifacts in the Philippines. The pearl was given to her by Reyes's grandfather, who visited her in Manila and brought a giant clam as a gift or pasalubong, a custom in Filipino culture.

The Giga Pearl was formed by a Tridacna gigas clam, the largest extant bivalve. These giant clams can grow up to approximately four and a half feet (1.4 m) wide and can weigh up to approximately 550 pounds (250 kg). They are found in the eastern Indian Ocean and west Pacific Ocean, from Thailand and western Australia eastward to Micronesia.

== Value ==
The Giga Pearl is valued at $140 million CAD (100 million USD). The pearl is currently being displayed in an octopus sculpture gilded in 22k gold by the artist Bethany Krull.
