= Tahitian pearl =

Cultured pearl from the sea around Tahiti

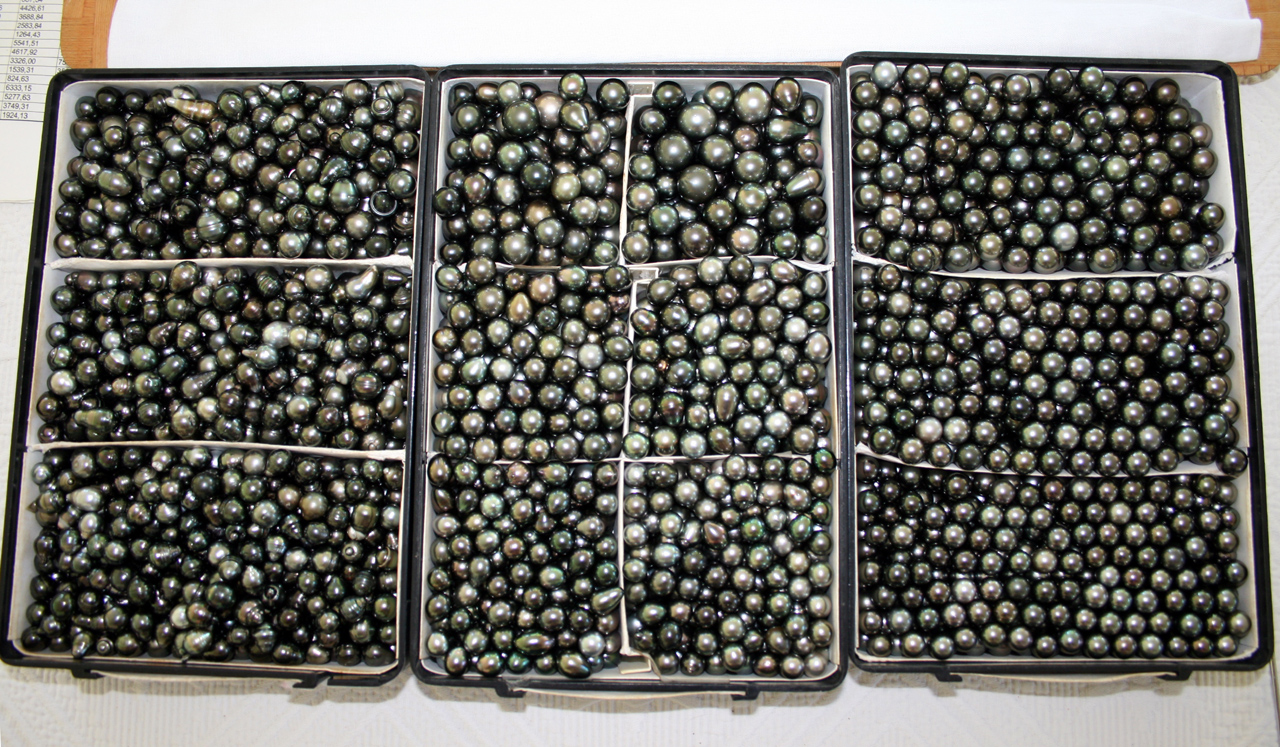
Tahitian pearls in bulk

The Tahitian pearl (or black pearl) poé (pearl in Te Reo Tahiti) poérava (black pearl in Te Reo Tahiti) is an organic gem formed from the black lip oyster (Pinctada margaritifera). These pearls derive their name from the fact that they are primarily cultivated around the islands of French Polynesia, around Tahiti.

== Description ==
Tahitian pearls come in a range of colors from white to black. They can contain various undertones and overtones of green, pink, blue, silver and yellow. The most valuable of these are of the darker variety, as the naturally dark tones of the Tahitian pearls is a unique quality among pearls. Because of their darker hues, Tahitian pearls are commonly known as "black pearls". A true black Tahitian pearl is extremely rare, and largely considered one of the most beautiful kinds of pearls in the world. Most Tahitian pearls that are identified as “black” are actually charcoal grey, silver, or dark green.

The cultured Tahitian pearl comes in various shapes, which include round, semi-round, button, circle, oval, teardrop, semi-baroque and baroque.

An advantage of the Tahitian pearl is that the oyster inside of which they grow is quite large, sometimes weighing as much as ten pounds. This means that a Tahitian pearl can more easily grow to a larger-than-average size.

Due to the variety of shapes and colors of the Tahitian pearl, it has been known to fit in any jewelry setting. The versatility and mixture of color give it its value.

== Culturing ==
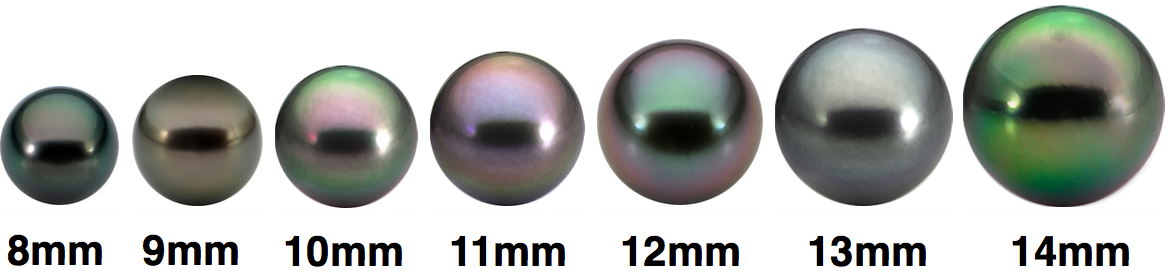
Tahitian pearl sizes in different colors

The culturing process of a Tahitian pearl involves a grafter, who inserts a bead made from a mollusk shell into the gonad, or reproductive organ, of the mature Pinctada margaritifera mollusk. It takes two years for an oyster to mature enough to begin producing pearls. Inserted with the bead is a piece of mantle tissue from a donor mollusk, which influences the color of the pearl being produced and provides epithelial cells to ensure that the oyster produces nacre around the nucleus. The materials used in the process are organic, to decrease the probability of the oyster rejecting the nucleus. The shell is sanded and rounded to form the bead, so the pearls produced have a rounder shape. The whole process takes place quickly, because oysters cannot survive very long out of water.

== As an export ==
The Tahitian pearl is French Polynesia’s largest export, making up over 55 percent of the country's annual exports of 20 million dollars. The cultured Tahitian pearl farms are located in the blue lagoons of the Tuamotu-Gambier Archipelagos, which are two of the five archipelagos which make up French Polynesia (Tahiti is the largest island in French Polynesia and the Tahitians make up the main ethnic group in the territory).

== See also ==
- Servilia's pearl, a black pearl given by Julius Caesar to his love Servilia
