= Servilia's pearl =

Pearl given by Julius Caesar to his favourite mistress Servilia

- Type of stone: Pearl
- Color: Black
- Country of origin: Roman Republic
- Discovered: Possibly Gaul
- Original owner: Julius Caesar
- Owner: Servilia

Servilia's pearl was a pearl given by Julius Caesar to his favourite mistress Servilia. It was described by imperial biographer Suetonius to be a lone (uniones, meaning "singleton") large black pearl worth six million sesterces (approximately 1.5 billion dollars in 2019 value), making it perhaps the most valuable gem of all time. It may also be the first known individual pearl recorded in human history.

== Historical context ==
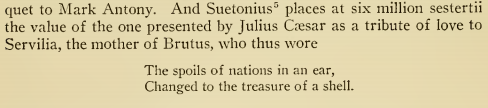
Text describing the pearl being worn as an earring.

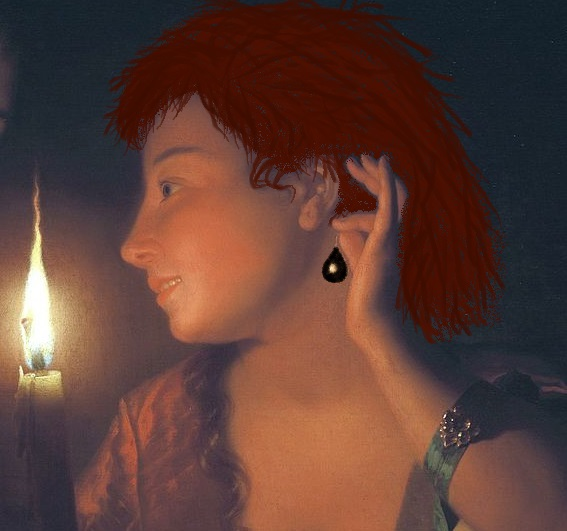
Servilia's pearl is described as a large black gem.

Caesar was said to be a great connoisseur of pearls; guessing their value just by weighing them in his palm was one of his party tricks, and during his consulship he had restricted the buying of pearls based on age, marital status and wealth. Unmarried women were not allowed to own them (this resulted in a surge in weddings in Rome) and people who were not affluent enough to acquire them safely without risking their financial security were banned from purchasing them.

There are conflicting reports on when exactly Caesar gave Servilia the pearl; some sources claim it happened during his first consulship in 59 BC while others state it was when he returned from the war in Gaul. If it was after the war it is possible that Caesar had acquired the pearl as a spoil of war during his campaign in Gaul, or possibly during his invasions of Britain, (Note: A common point of speculation among historians has been that Caesar was partially motivated to invade Britain because of its supply of pearls. That Caesar would have done so specifically to obtain a pearl just for Servilia has been proposed but has not gained any wide support.) since the coasts of the island as well as Scottish lakes were prime location for harvesting pearls. Adrian Goldsworthy speculated in his book Caesar, Life of a Colossus that Caesar may have paid for the pearl with money he had gotten from a bribe from Pompey. Robert B. Kebric reflected that Caesar may have paid with tribute money he received from Pharaoh Ptolemy XII Auletes.

== Value ==
Caesar spent 6 million sesterces (Note: Sesterces were silver coins issued only on rare occasions in the Roman Republic.) on the pearl, which is about 1.5 billion American dollars in 2019 currency, although exact calculations of its value is impossible due to the difference in purchasing power, and economist Gilles Jacoud notes that for ridiculously expensive objects the actual value would become arbitrary for someone like Caesar, who could afford anything. He expresses that Roman readers of Suetonius would likely have had a much better understanding for its actual exceptional value. Similarly Mary Saul, an expert of pearls and gastropod shells, states that: "we do not need to know the equivalent in today's currency to appreciate that he paid an enormous price [for it]". A contemporary comparison would be that 900 sesterces was the average yearly salary for an infantryman in one of Caesar's legions, or that it could pay for a year's rent for 3000 Roman tenants.

It has also been observed that when Caesar himself was held hostage by pirates as a young man, his ransom of 20 talents (approximately $250,000) was a mere fraction of the worth of the pearl he acquired for his mistress. During the turn of the 19th century it was noted that it is unlikely that any individual pearl of such value would appear again.

== Analysis ==
Caesar's motives for giving the pearl to Servilia have been the subject of debate among historians.

Historically it has been popularly suggested that the pearl was an apology by Caesar to Servilia after an engagement between her son Brutus and Caesar's daughter Julia fell apart, but since later research has all but confirmed that no such engagement existed (Note: Had it in fact been true then the disappointment for Servilia and Brutus would have been very extreme since Julia's engagement was broken off so she could marry Pompey, the man who had killed Brutus father.) (the marriage was likely supposed to be between Julia and a man by the same name) (Note: Possibly a maternal uncle or cousin of Brutus.) this explanation has been largely abandoned. An alternative related theory put forth by Ramon L. Jiménez is that the pearl was indeed gifted to make up for Julia's broken engagement, but not to Servilia's son, but to Servilia's brother who did bear the same name as her son at the time. (Note: Brutus had been adopted by his mother's brother Quintus Servilius Caepio, likely because Quintus did not have a living son, thus Brutus started going by the name Quintus Servilius Caepio Brutus. Adoption of a sororal nephew was rather common in Rome if a man did not have any legitimate sons, since it continued on the name within the same bloodline.)

Other interpretations range from that of Friedrich Münzer and his followers who believed that the pearl was an earnest marriage proposal by Caesar, (Note: Servilia's second husband Decimus Junius Silanus had died in 60 BC and Caesar had recently divorced Pompeia after the Bona Dea scandal. This would have been the first time since their childhood that both of them were not married.) that he used it to overshadow the pearls famously displayed by Pompey in his 61 BC triumph, that it was simply a present meant to soothe Servilia after Caesar had agreed to marry the younger Calpurnia, to that of the majority of modern historians who just see it as Caesar feeling he was able to spend any money he wanted on his beloved mistress without any ulterior motives. Robert B. Kebric mused that "the pearl may only indicate the first opportunity that the previously debtridden Caesar had to give his mistress a gift worthy of his love for her".

== Cultural depictions ==
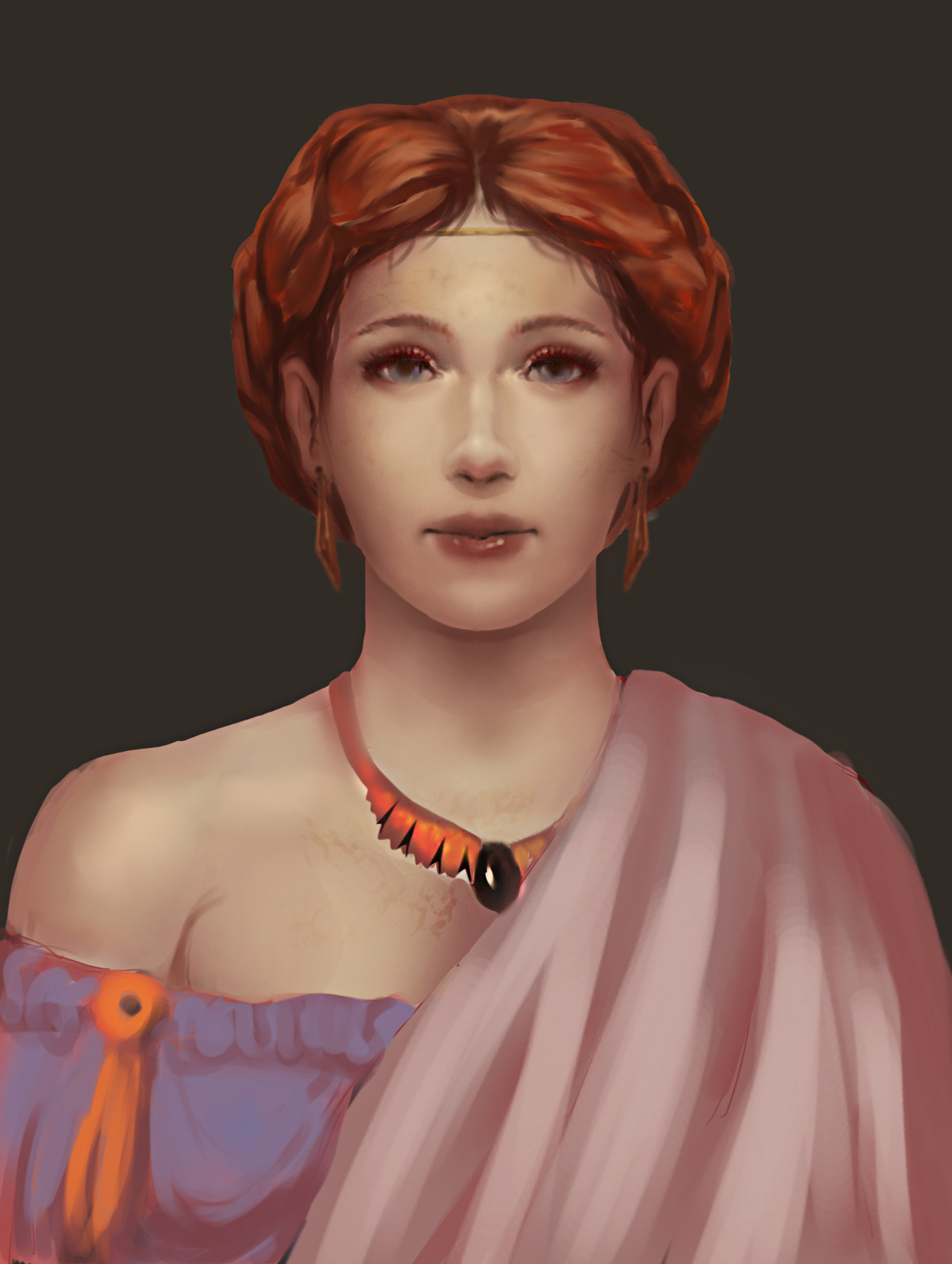
Servilia wearing the pearl as a necklace.

Servilia and the pearl are the subject of poems by Hafiz and John Dryden. In the 1916 story "War" from The Drama magazine a pearl which is on sale is stated to perhaps be Servilia's pearl. In the play Marcus Brutus and Silver Queen Saloon the titular Brutus becomes enraged at Caesar and his mother due to her accepting the pearl.

In Thornton Wilder's 1948 novel The Ides of March the pearl is given to Servilia in gratitude because Caesar suspects that Brutus is his natural son. Here the pearl is described as "rose" in color. In his foreword to the book Wilder also made sure to note that the event of Caesar giving Servilia the extravagant pearl is indeed historical. In the novel The Written Script by Annalita Marsigli it is portrayed that Caesar gifted Servilia the pearl to make her boast publicly that he had seduced her, which was a move by him to get back at her half-brother Cato. In Love is a Pie: Stories and Plays the gifting of the pearl causes Caesar's wife Pompeia to be enraged with him. In Rubicon: The Last Years of the Roman Republic by Tom Holland, Caesar compares buying the outrageously expensive pearl for Servilia to his decision to pay for 3000 Romans rents, both being moves to seduce his fellow citizens, he expresses that he thinks nothing of it. In Prepare Them for Caesar, by Mary Louise Mabie, Servilia's brother Cato comments that the pearl is too valuable to actually wear. Many novels have depicted the outdated perception that the pearl was a consolation for the broken engagement between their respective children, such as in Respublica: A Novel of Cicero's Roman Republic by Richard Braccia, and in Caesar: Let the Dice Fly by Colleen McCullough's (from the Masters of Rome series) in which it is described as pink (perhaps inspired by Wilder). In The Field of Swords the pearl is meant as a wedding proposal and Servilia initially rejects it, throwing it back at Caesar, because she believes she is infertile and does not want to make him enter a marriage which has no chance of conceiving children. In the novel Cleopatra: Whispers from the Nile, by Lorraine Blundell, Servilia looks at and thinks of the pearl, reflecting on how it is the most extravagant gift she had ever received by her love.

The pearl is mentioned in Jules Verne's 1870 classical novel Twenty Thousand Leagues Under the Seas as an example of an extraordinarily valuable pearl. Commercial pearls named after Servilia have been sold.

The pearl is the plot device in the story The Eye of the Minotaur of the Franco-Belgian comic Alix, in this story it is shown that the pearl is cursed and slowly poisoning Servilia, prompting Caesar to send Alix, his companion Enak and Brutus on a journey to find the merchant who sold it to him.

== See also ==
- Roman currency
- Tahitian pearl
- List of individual gemstones
