= Pearl of Puerto =

Pearl found in the Philippine Sea

- Type of stone: Pearl
- Weight: 75 pounds (170,000 carats)
- Color: White (exact color grade unknown)
- Country of origin: Philippines
- Estimated value: US$100 million

The Pearl of Puerto, also known as the Pearl of Puerto Princesa (Filipino: Perlas ng Puerto), is an unauthenticated pearl that was found in the Philippine Sea by a Filipino fisherman. It measures 2.2 feet (67 cm) long, 1 foot (30 cm) wide and weighs 34 kilograms (75 lb).

== History ==
The pearl was found by accident by Cuyunon fishermen when they tried to pull the anchor of their ship from the seabed because of an impending storm. One of the fishermen then decided to dive to free the anchor and then found a giant clam. The fishermen thought of cooking the clam and then discovered the giant pearl. The pearl was hidden for 10 years by one of the fishermen as a token of good luck by rubbing the pearl before going out fishing. It is said that rubbing the pearl would give him a lot of fish to catch. The pearl was given to Aileen Cynthia Maggay-Amurao, a tourism officer in Puerto Princesa and relative of the fisherman, since the fisherman was going to move to another place and the pearl needed safekeeping. The pearl was then displayed in Puerto Princesa, where it remains to this day.

== Characteristics ==
The pearl has a length close to 2 feet and the weight of the pearl is close to 34 kilograms. Its vertical folds that emulate the shell of the tridacna gigas indicate that it is a carved shell. Unlike true pearls, the Pearl of Puerto does not show iridescence. Since the pearl is bigger than the Pearl of Lao Tzu, the value of the pearl is higher. It is estimated that the pearl would cost around US$100 million.
