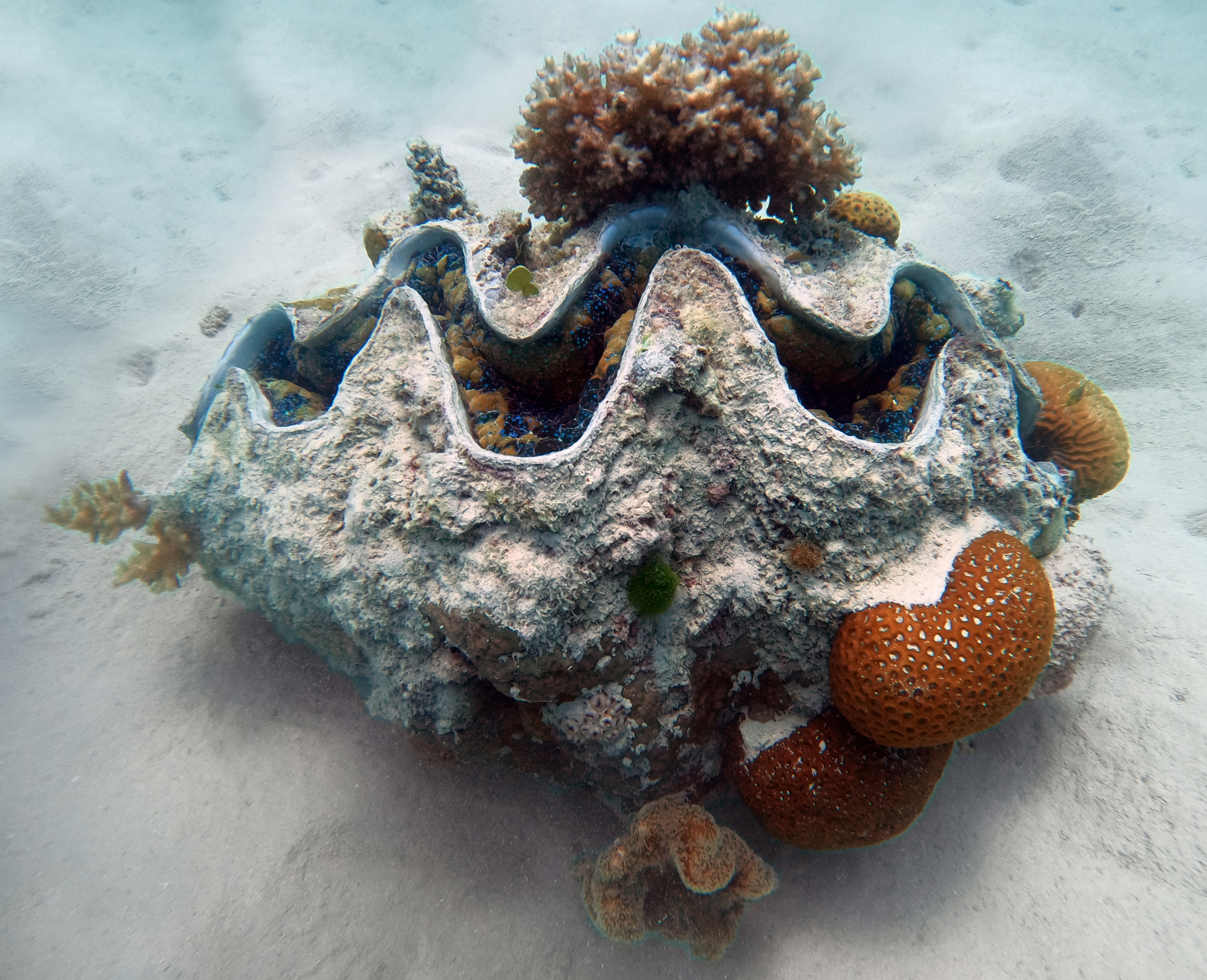
- In Michaelmas Cay; Great Barrier Reef, Queensland, Australia

Conservation status
- Critically Endangered (IUCN 3.1)
- CITES Appendix II

Scientific classification
- Kingdom: Animalia
- Phylum: Mollusca
- Class: Bivalvia
- Order: Cardiida
- Family: Cardiidae
- Genus: Tridacna
- Species: T. gigas

Binomial name
- Tridacna gigas (Linnaeus, 1758)

Synonyms
- Chama gigantea Perry, 1811

= Giant clam =

Species of bivalve

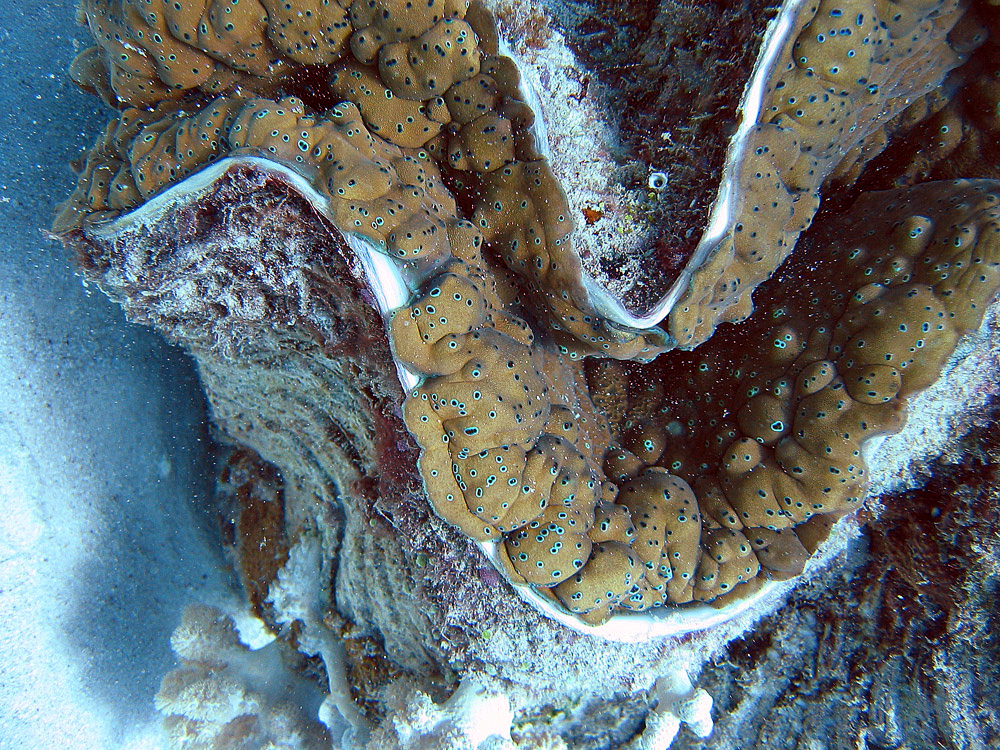
Mantle with light-sensitive spots, which detect danger and cause the clam to close

Tridacna gigas, the giant clam, is the best-known species of the giant clam genus Tridacna. Giant clams are the largest living bivalve molluscs. Several other species of "giant clam" in the genus Tridacna are often misidentified as Tridacna gigas.

These clams were known to indigenous peoples of East Asia for thousands of years and the Venetian scholar and explorer Antonio Pigafetta documented them in a journal as early as 1521. One of a number of large clam species native to the shallow coral reefs of the South Pacific and Indian oceans, they may weigh more than 200 kilograms (440 lb), measure as much as 120 cm (47 in) across, and have an average lifespan in the wild of more than 100 years. They also are found off the shores of the Philippines and in the South China Sea in the coral reefs of Malaysia and are generally found at a depth of 6-65 feet.

The giant clam lives on flat coral sand or broken coral and may be found at depths of as great as 20 m (66 ft). Its range covers the Indo-Pacific, but populations are diminishing quickly and the giant clam has become extinct in many areas where it was once common.

Although larval clams are planktonic, they become sessile in adulthood. The creature's mantle tissues act as a habitat for the symbiotic single-celled dinoflagellate algae (zooxanthellae) from which the adult clams get most of their nutrition. By day, the clam opens its shell and extends its mantle tissue so that the algae receive the sunlight they need to photosynthesise. This method of algal farming is under study as a model for highly efficient bioreactors.

== Anatomy ==
Young T. gigas are difficult to distinguish from other species of Tridacninae. Adult T. gigas are the only giant clams unable to close their shells completely, allowing part of the brownish-yellow mantle to remain visible. Tridacna gigas has four or five vertical folds in its shell, which serves as the main characteristic differentiating it from the similar T. derasa that has six or seven vertical folds. Similar to coral matrices composed of calcium carbonate, giant clams grow their shells through the process of biomineralization, which is very sensitive to seasonal temperature. The isotopic ratio of oxygen in carbonate and the ratio between strontium and calcium together may be used to determine historical sea surface temperature.

The mantle border itself is covered in several hundred to several thousand pinhole eyespots approximately 0.5 mm (0.020 in) in diameter. Each one consists of a small cavity containing a pupil-like aperture and a base of 100 or more photoreceptors sensitive to three different ranges of light, including UV, which may be unique among molluscs. These receptors allow T. gigas to partially close their shells in response to dimming of light, change in the direction of light, or the movement of an object. The optical system forms an image by sequential, local dimming of some eyes using pigment from the aperture.

=== Largest specimens ===
The largest known T. gigas specimen measured 137 centimetres (4 ft 6 in); it weighed 230 kg (510 lb) dead and was estimated to be 250 kg (550 lb) alive. It was discovered around 1817 on the north western coast of Sumatra, Indonesia, and its shells are now on display in a museum in Northern Ireland.

A heavier giant clam was found in 1956 off the Japanese island of Ishigaki. The shell's length was 115 centimetres (3 ft 9 in), and it weighed 333 kilograms (734 lb) dead and estimated 340 kilograms (750 lb) alive.

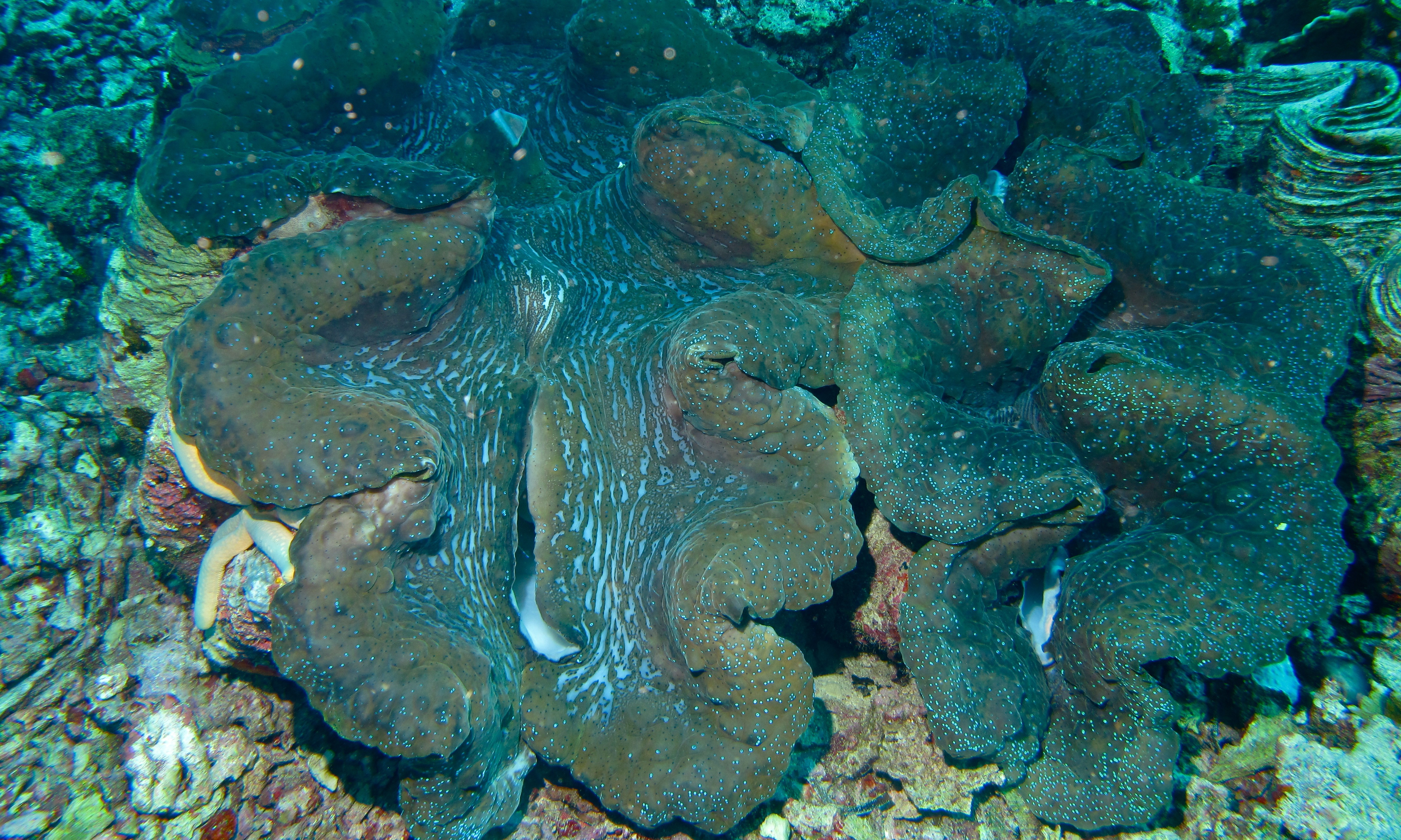
In Bunaken Island, Sulawesi, Indonesia

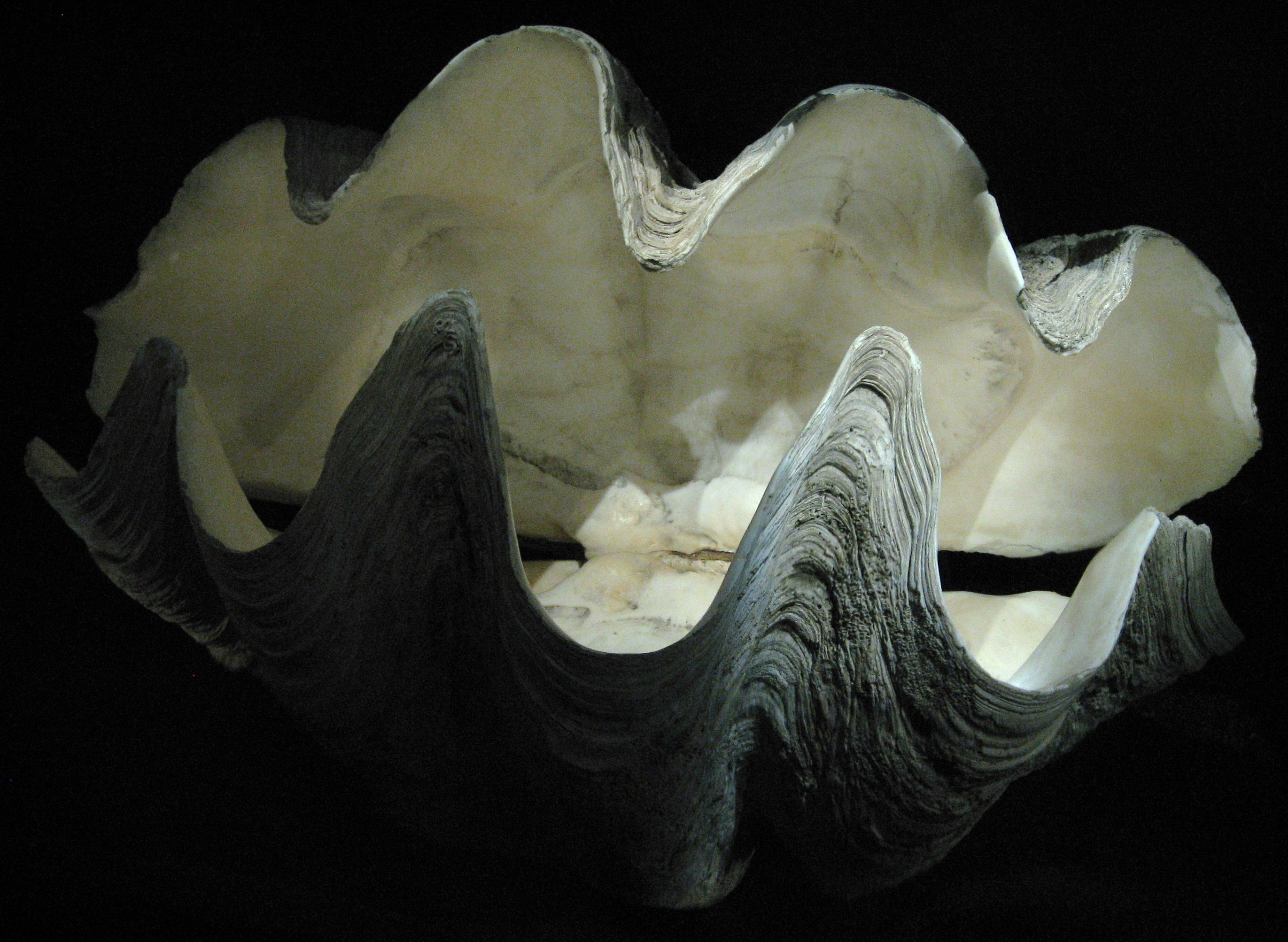
Empty shell in the French National Museum of Natural History

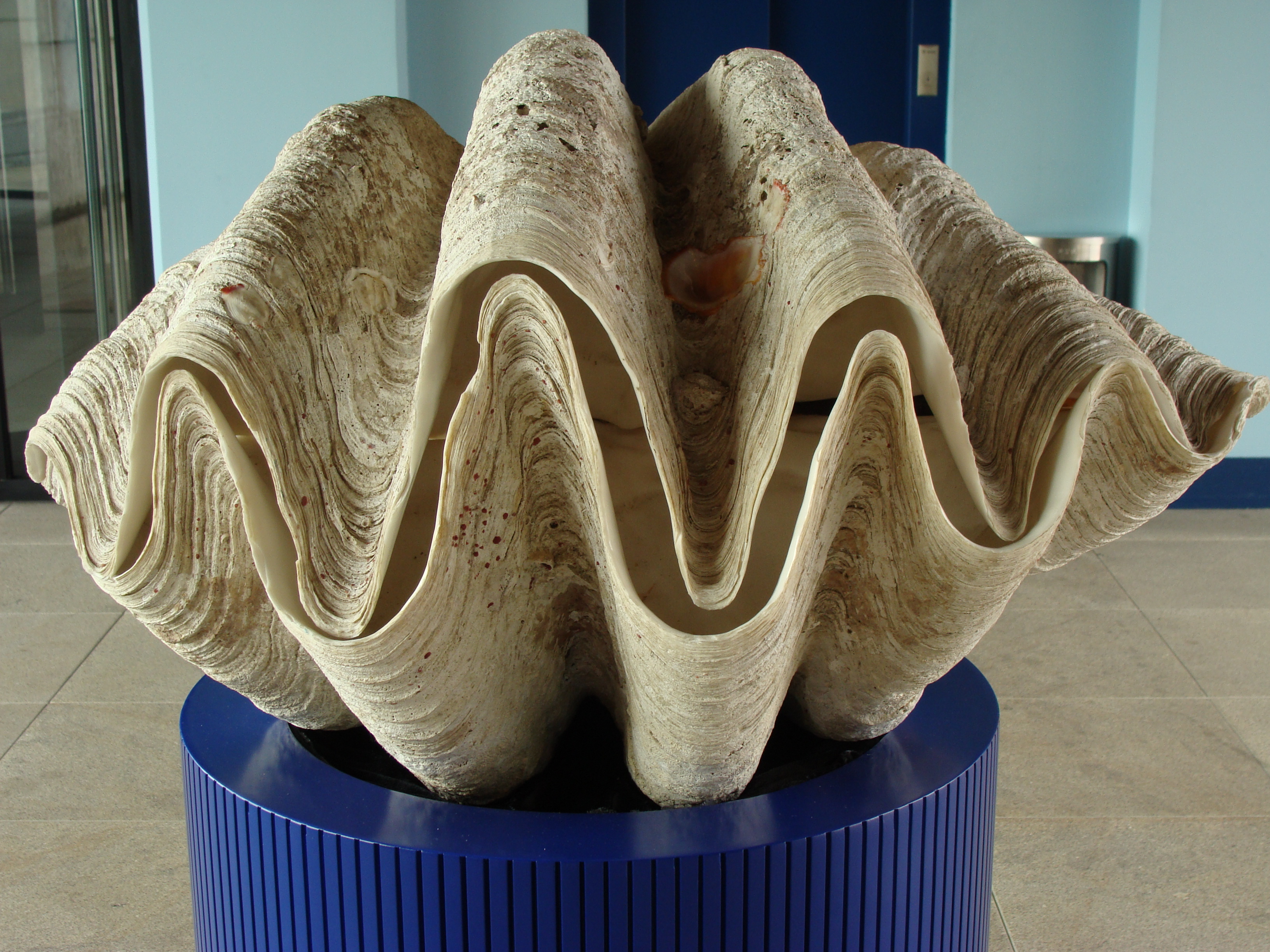
Empty shell from the Aquarium Finisterrae in Spain

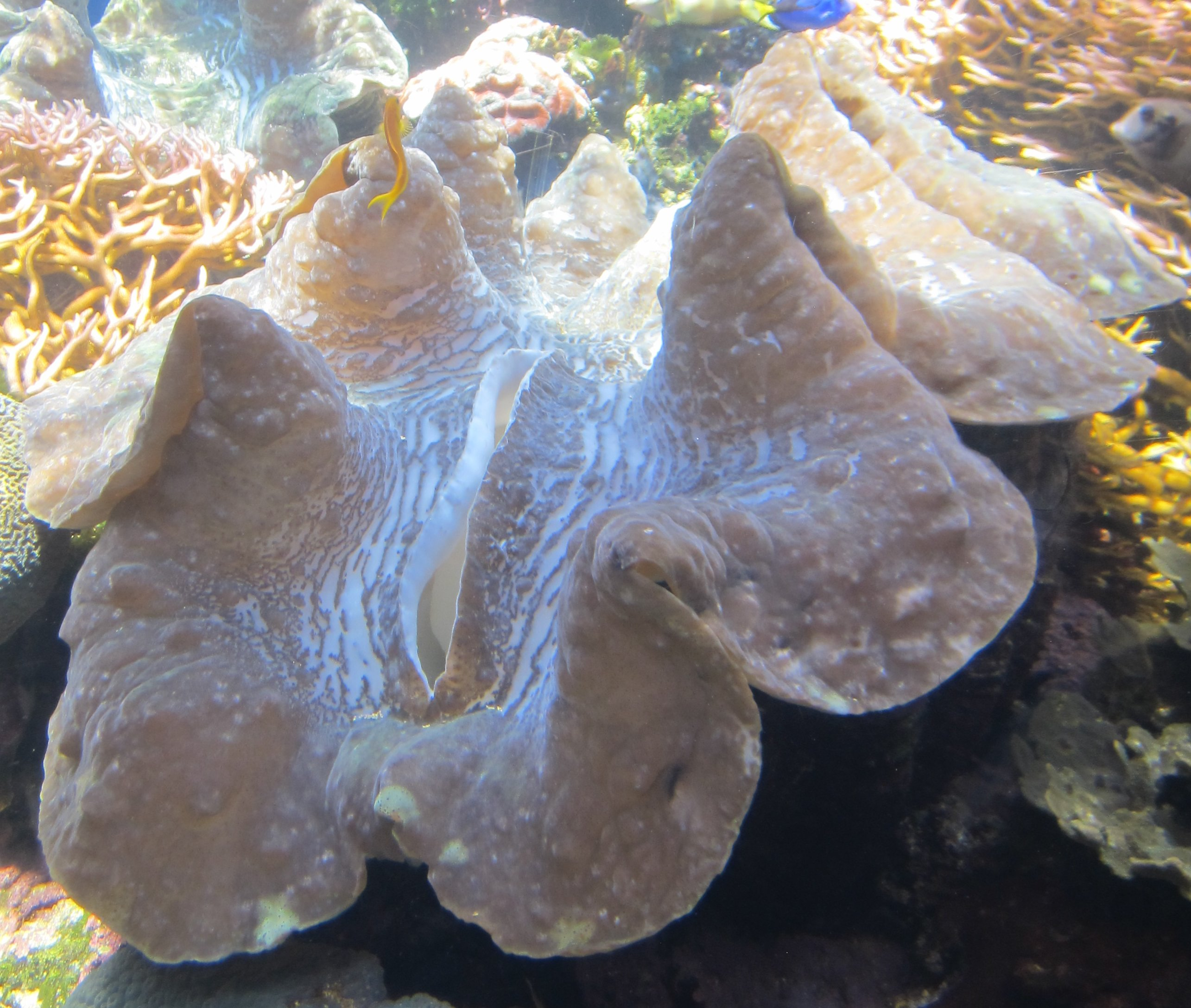
In Waikiki Aquarium, Honolulu, Hawaii, United States

== Ecology ==
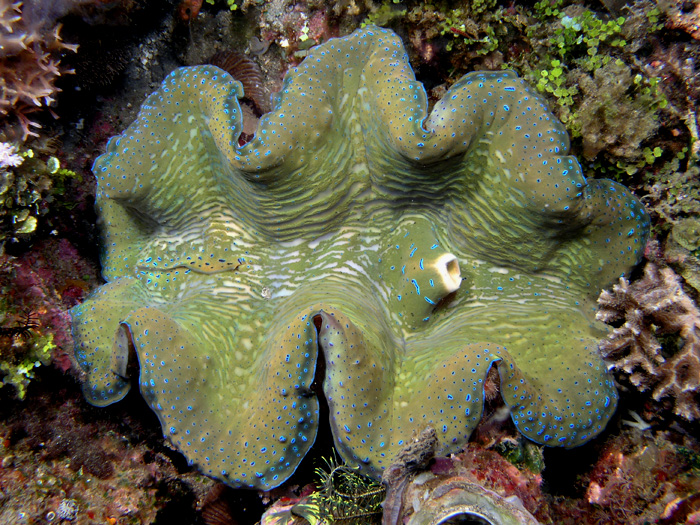
Green and blue individual from East Timor

=== Feeding ===
Giant clams are filter-feeders, yet 65–70 percent of their nutritional needs are supplied by zooxanthellae. This enables giant clams to grow as large as one meter in length even in nutrient-poor coral-reef waters. The clams cultivate algae in a special circulatory system that enables them to keep a substantially higher number of symbionts per unit of volume. The mantle's edges are packed with symbiotic zooxanthellae, which presumably use carbon dioxide, phosphates, and nitrates supplied by the clam.

In very small clams—10 milligrams (0.010 g) dry tissue weight—filter feeding provides approximately 65% of total carbon needed for respiration and growth; comparatively larger clams (10 grams (0.35 oz)) acquire only 34% of carbon from this source. A single species of zooxenthellae may be symbionts of both giant clams and nearby reef–building (hermatypic) corals.

Recent modelling work suggests that giant clams host photosynthetic algae arranged in vertical columns and employ iridescent iridocyte cells to channel sunlight; in a model developed by Sweeney et al. (2024) this arrangement yields a quantum photon-to-electron conversion efficiency of up to ~67%, placing them among the most efficient natural solar-energy harvesting systems known.

=== Reproduction ===
Tridacna gigas reproduce sexually and are hermaphrodites (producing both eggs and sperm by one clam). While self-fertilization is not possible, having both characteristics does allow them to reproduce with any other member of the species as well as hermaphrodically. As with all other forms of sexual reproduction, hermaphroditism ensures that new gene combinations be passed to further generations. This flexibility in reproduction reduces the burden of finding a compatible mate, while simultaneously doubling the number of offspring produced.

Since giant clams cannot move themselves, they adopt broadcast spawning, releasing sperm and eggs into the water. A transmitter substance called spawning induced substance (SIS) helps synchronize the release of sperm and eggs to ensure fertilization. The substance is released through a syphonal outlet. Other clams can detect SIS immediately. Incoming water passes chemoreceptors situated close to the incurrent syphon that transmit the information directly to the cerebral ganglia, a simple form of brain.

Detection of SIS stimulates the giant clam to swell its mantle in the central region and to contract its adductor muscle. Each clam then fills its water chambers and closes the incurrent syphon. The shell contracts vigorously with the adductor's help, so the excurrent chamber's contents flows through the excurrent syphon. After a few contractions containing only water, eggs and sperm appear in the excurrent chamber and then pass through the excurrent syphon into the water. Female eggs have a diameter of 100 micrometres (0.0039 in). Egg release initiates the reproductive process. An adult T. gigas can release more than 500 million eggs at a time.

Spawning seems to coincide with incoming tides near the second (full), third, and fourth (new) quarters of the moon phase. Spawning contractions occur every two or three minutes, with intense spawning ranging from thirty minutes to two and a half hours. Clams that do not respond to the spawning of neighboring clams may be reproductively inactive.

=== Development ===
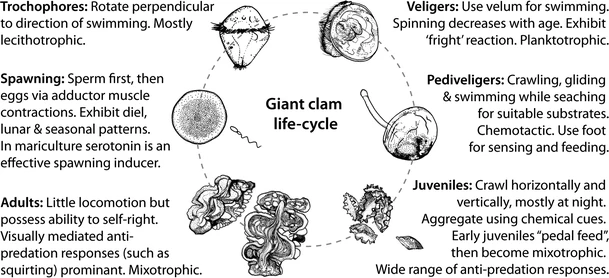
Behaviours associated with different life cycle stages

The fertilized egg floats in the sea for approximately 12 hours until eventually a larva (trochophore) hatches. It then starts to produce a calcium carbonate shell. Two days after fertilization it measures 160 micrometres (0.0063 in). Soon it develops a "foot," which is used to move on the ground. Larvae also can swim to search for appropriate habitat.

At roughly one week of age, the clam settles on the ground, although it changes location frequently within the first few weeks. The larva does not yet have symbiotic algae, so it depends completely on plankton. Also, free-floating zooxanthellae are captured while filtering food. Eventually the front adductor muscle disappears and the rear muscle moves into the clam's center. Many small clams die at this stage. The clam is considered a juvenile when it reaches a length of 20 cm (8 in). It is difficult to observe the growth rate of T. gigas in the wild, but laboratory-reared giant clams have been observed to grow 12 cm (4.7 in) a year.

The ability for Tridacna to grow to such large sizes with fleshy mantles that extend beyond the edges of their shells is considered to be the result of total reorganization of bivalve development and morphology. Historically, two evolutionary explanations have been suggested for this process. Sir Yonge suggested and maintained for many years that the visceral-pedal ganglia complex rotate 180 degrees relative to the shell, requiring that they develop and evolve independently. Stasek proposed instead that the growth occurs primarily in a posterior direction instead of the more typical direction of ventral in most bivalves, which is reflected in the transitional stages of alternative ways of growing that juveniles undergo.

== Human relevance ==
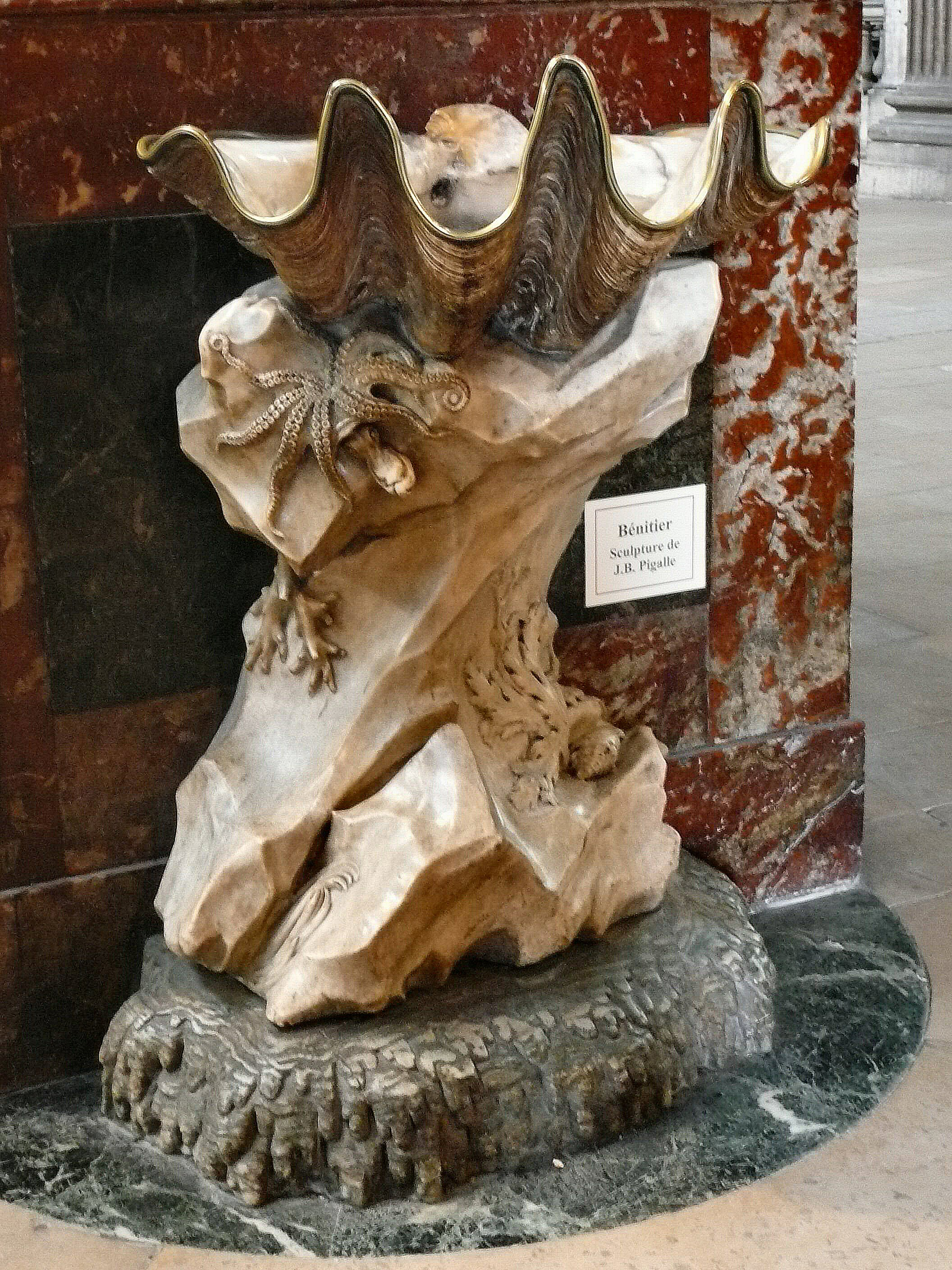
One of the two clam stoups of the Église Saint-Sulpice in Paris, carved by Jean-Baptiste Pigalle

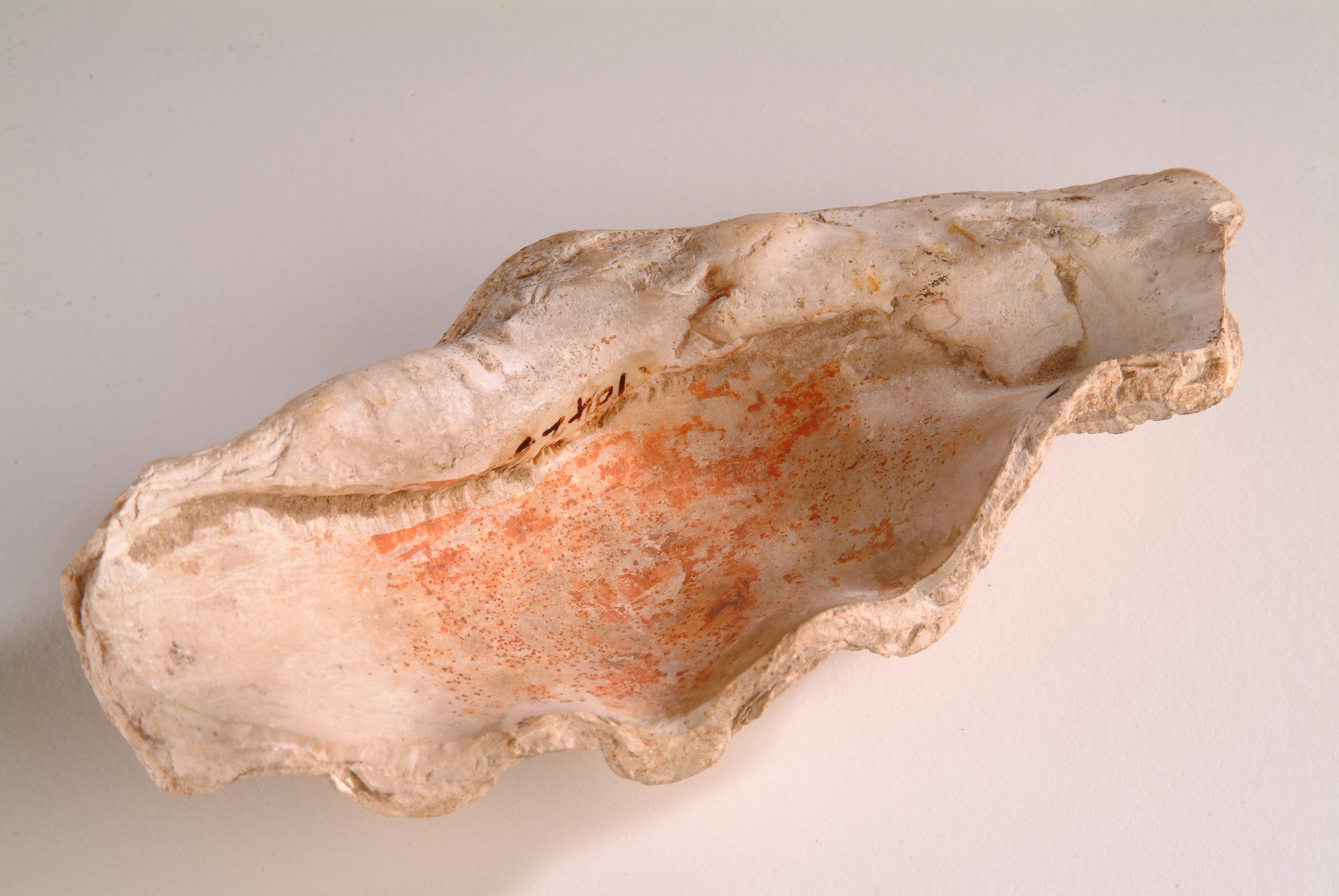
Piece of shell that was used in ancient Egypt as a paint holder

The main reason that giant clams are becoming endangered is likely to be intensive exploitation by bivalve fishers. Mainly large adults are killed because they are the most profitable.

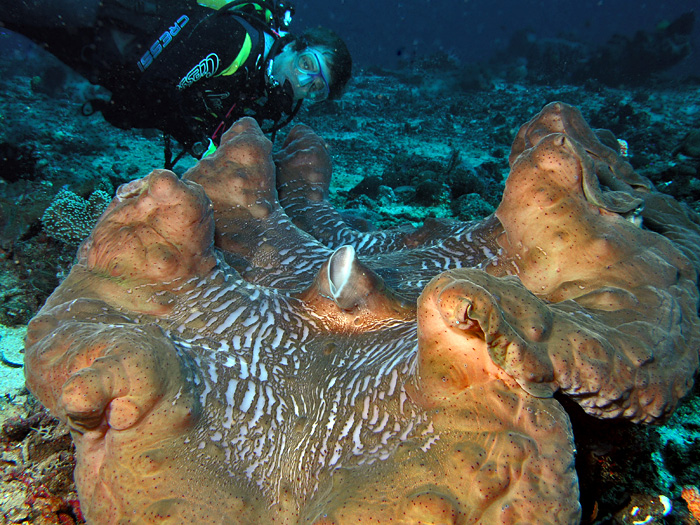
From East Timor, more than one meter in length

The giant clam is considered a delicacy in Japan (known as himejako), France, Southeast Asia, and many Pacific Islands. Some Asian foods include the meat from the muscles of clams. Large amounts of money are paid for the adductor muscle, which is believed to have aphrodisiac powers in some Chinese regions.

On the black market, giant clam shells are sold as decorative accoutrements.

=== Legend ===
As is often the case historically with uncharacteristically large species, the giant clam has been misunderstood.

Even in countries where giant clams are easily seen, stories incorrectly depict giant clams as aggressive. For instance, although the clams are unable to close their shells completely, a Polynesian folk tale relates that a monkey's hand was bitten off by one, and even though once past larval stage the clams are sessile, a Maori legend relates a supposed attack on a canoe by a giant clam. Starting from the eighteenth century, claims of danger had been related to the western world. In the 1920s, a reputable science magazine, Popular Mechanics, once claimed that the great mollusc had caused deaths. Versions of the U.S. Navy Diving Manual even gave detailed instructions for releasing oneself from its grasp by severing the adductor muscles used to close its shell. In an account of the discovery of the Pearl of Lao Tzu, Wilburn Cobb said he was told that a Dyak diver was drowned when the Tridacna closed its shell on his arm. In reality, the slow speed of their adductor muscle contraction and the need to force water out of their shells while closing prevents them from trapping a human.

Other myths focus on the huge size of giant clams being associated with long age. While giant clams do live a long time and may serve as a bio-metric for historic climatic conditions, their large size is more likely associated with rapid growth.

=== Aquaculture ===
Mass culture of giant clams began at the Micronesian Mariculture Demonstration Center in Palau (Belau). A large Australian government-funded project from 1985 to 1992 mass-cultured giant clams, particularly T. gigas at James Cook University's Orpheus Island Research Station, and supported the development of hatcheries in the Pacific Islands and the Philippines. Seven of the ten known species of giant clams in the world are found in the coral reefs of the South China Sea.

== Conservation status ==
There is concern among conservationists about whether those who use the species as a source of livelihood are overexploiting it. The numbers in the wild have been greatly reduced by extensive harvesting for food and the aquarium trade. The species is listed in Appendix II of the Convention on International Trade in Endangered Species (CITES) meaning international trade (including in parts and derivatives) is regulated.

T. gigas has been reported as locally extinct in peninsular Malaysia, while T. derasa and Hippopus porcellanus are restricted to Eastern Malaysia. These recent local extinctions have motivated the introduction of giant clams to Hawaii and Micronesia following maricultural advancements. Restocked individuals in the Philippines have successfully dispersed their own spawned larvae to at least several hundred meters away after only ten years.

== See also ==
- Platyceramus, the largest bivalve in the fossil record
- Alatoconchidae, large-bodied extinct bivalves
- Plicatostylidae, large-bodied extinct bivalves
