= Pearl of Lao Tzu =

One-time largest known pearl

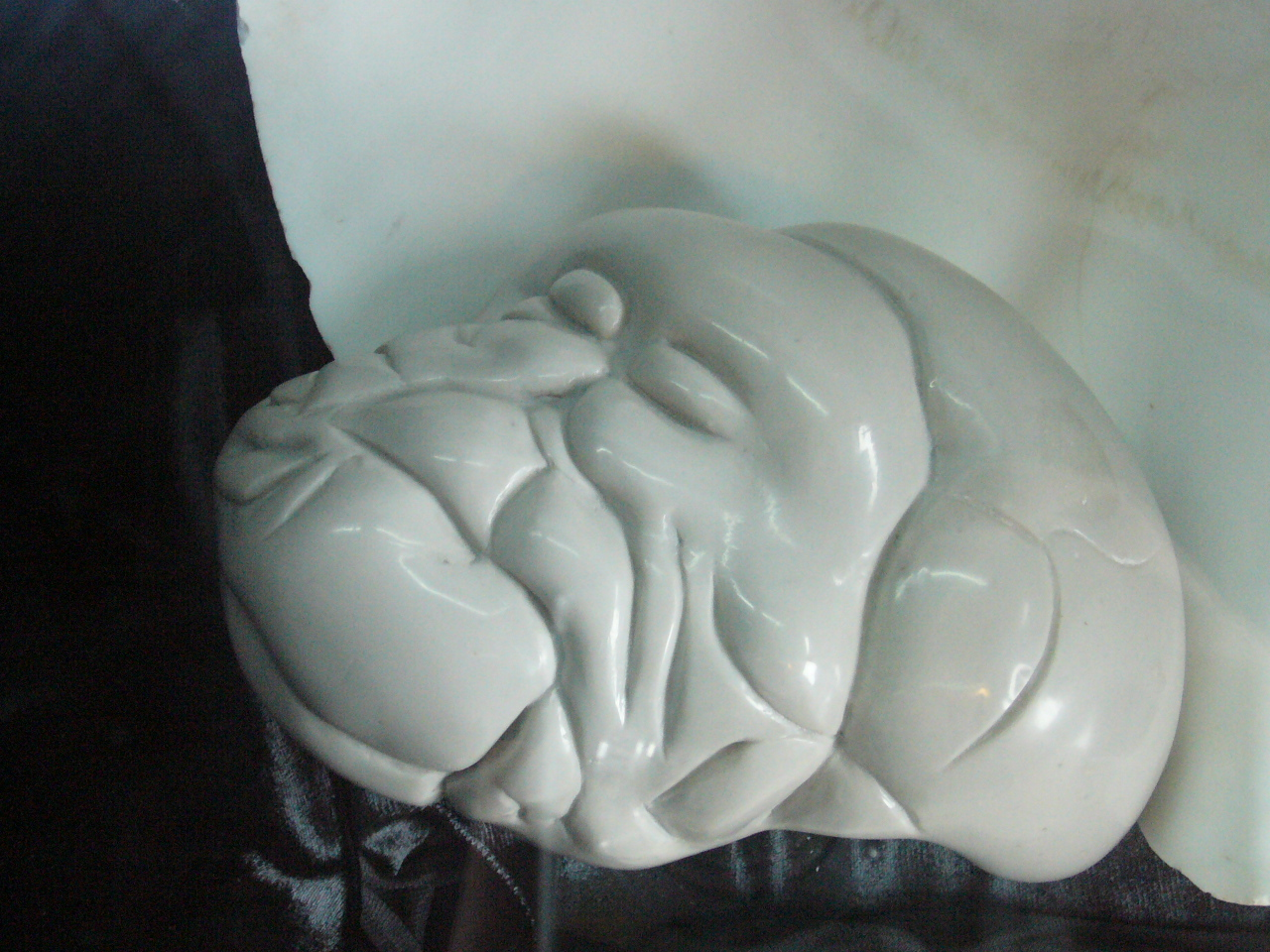
Replica of the Pearl of Lao Tzu

The Pearl of Lao Tzu was once considered the world's largest known pearl.

The pearl was found by a Filipino diver in the Palawan sea, which surrounds the island of Palawan in the Philippines. It is not considered a gemstone pearl, but is instead known as a "clam pearl" or "Tridacna pearl" from a giant clam. It measures 24 centimeters in diameter (9.45 inches) and weighs 6.4 kilograms (14.2 lb).

== History ==
The only clues as to the pearl's provenance come from Wilburn Dowell Cobb, a visiting US archaeologist from San Francisco, who brought the pearl from the Philippines in 1939 and owned it until his death in 1979. He published an account of how he came to own it in Natural History magazine. According to Cobb, it was found by a diver at Brooke's Point, Palawan. Cobb gave a lengthy, detailed and convoluted account of how he wanted to buy it from a local chief when he first heard of it in 1934, but the chief, a Muslim, refused to sell because he considered the pearl sacred, in part because of its resemblance to the turbaned head of the prophet Muhammad. Cobb then tells of how he saved the life of the chief's son, who was stricken with malaria, in 1936 and was given the pearl as a token of gratitude. Because of its sacred associations, the pearl came to be known as the Pearl of Allah.

Three decades later, Cobb embellished the provenance with a new account in the February 1969 Mensa Bulletin, promoting the pearl as an artifact of Chinese legend. He described a 1939 encounter with a Chinese man named Lee, who told him that the pearl had first been grown in a much smaller clam around a jade amulet inserted by a disciple of the legendary sage Laozi more than 2,500 years ago, and been transferred over the centuries to ever larger clams, growing to record size. Wars had supposedly been fought over the artifact, and it had been sent off to the Philippines as a protective measure, where it was lost in a storm.

After Cobb's death in 1979, Peter Hoffman and Victor Barbish bought the pearl from his estate for $200,000. Barbish has claimed to have had further contact with other Li family members. (The legend of a "Pearl of Laozi", however, is only known from the claims of Cobb and Barbish.)

When Victor Barbish borrowed money from a Joseph Bonicelli, he gave him an interest in the pearl. In 1990, Bonicelli took Barbish to court to collect his loan, and the court ruled that Hoffman, Barbish and Bonicelli were equal partners in the pearl. Bonicelli died in 1998, and after more legal proceedings, the court ordered the pearl to be sold (it has not been), with a third of the money going to Bonicelli's estate. It is not on display to the public and as of 2008 was being held as part of the Manatee County Probate inventory of Victor M. Barbish.

The pearl is owned in three equal shares by the heirs of Joe Bonicelli, Peter Hoffman and Victor Barbish.

== Value ==
While biologists would regard this object as a kind of pearl, gemologists regard it as a non-nacreous pearl, lacking the iridescence of the pearls that come from saltwater pearl oysters and freshwater pearl mussels. Because of its great size, a giant clam can create a very large pearl, but not an iridescent, gemlike one. The Gemological Institute of America (GIA) and CIBJO now simply use the term "pearl" (or, where appropriate, the more descriptive term "non-nacreous pearl") when referring to such items, rather than the term "calcareous concretion" and, under U.S. Federal Trade Commission rules, various mollusk pearls may be referred to as "pearls" without qualification.

Gemologist Michael Steenrod in Colorado Springs has appraised the pearl at $60,000,000 (1982) and $93,000,000 (2007). Another 1982 appraisal, by Lee Sparrow who owned a gem laboratory and appraisal business in the Phelan Building in San Francisco, put the pearl at $42,000,000.

In America, the pearl was exhibited at the Ripley's Believe It or Not! Odditorium in New York, valued at $35,000,000.

The Palawan Princess, a five-pound non-nacreous pearl then considered the second largest, was offered at auction by Bonhams and Butterfields of Los Angeles on December 6, 2009. Estimated to fetch between $300,000 to $400,000, it passed unsold.

== See also ==
- Pearl of Puerto
