= T. maxima =

T. maxima may refer to:

- Thalassina maxima, a mud lobster
- Thapsia maxima, a poisonous plant
- Thysanolaena maxima, a perennial grass
- Tipula maxima, a crane fly
- Tridacna maxima, an Indo-Pacific bivalve
- Trifurcula maxima, a European moth
- Trigonodes maxima, an owlet moth
