= List of threatened species known to occur in the Great Barrier Reef World Heritage Area =

These threatened species occur in the Great Barrier Reef World Heritage Area and are listed as threatened under the Convention on the Conservation of Migratory Species of Wild Animals (Bonn Convention), CITES (CITES) Agreement, China–Australia Migratory Bird Agreement (CAMBA), Japan–Australia Migratory Bird Agreement or the International Union for the Conservation of Nature Red List (IUCN Red List).

== Key ==
| Latin name | The scientific name of the species |
| Common names | Common names of the species |
| Image | An image of the species |
| Bonn Convention: Appendix I | "Migratory species that have been categorized as being in danger of extinction throughout all or a significant proportion of their range are listed on Appendix I of the Convention." |
| Bonn Convention: Appendix II | "Migratory species that have an unfavourable conservation status or would benefit significantly from international co-operation organised by tailored agreements are listed in Appendix II to the Convention." |
| CITES species: Appendix I | "Most endangered among CITES-listed animals and plants. They are threatened with extinction and CITES prohibits international trade in specimens of these species except when the purpose of the import is not commercial, for instance for scientific research." |
| CITES species: Appendix II | "International trade in specimens of Appendix-II species may be authorized by the granting of an export permit or re-export certificate." |
| CAMBA: China–Australia Migratory Bird Agreement | A treaty between Australia and China to minimise harm to the major areas used by migratory birds which migrate between the two countries. |
| JAMBA: Japan Australia Migratory Bird Agreement | A treaty between Australia and Japan to minimise harm to the major areas used by birds which migrate between the two countries. |
| IUCN status | The IUCN Red List status of the species. |

== Reptiles ==
Threatened reptile species
| Latin name | Common names | Image | Bonn Convention classification | CITES species classification | IUCN status |
|---|---|---|---|---|---|
| Natator depressus | Flatback sea turtle | | | Appendix I: species that are the most endangered | Least concern (LC or LR/lc); Lowest risk. Does not qualify for a more at risk category. Widespread and abundant taxa are included in this category. |
| Chelonia mydas | Green sea turtle | | Appendix I: Endangered migratory species; Appendix II: Migratory species conserved through Agreements | Appendix I: species that are the most endangered | Endangered (EN); Considered to be facing a very high risk of extinction in the wild. |
| Eretmochelys imbricata | Hawksbill sea turtle | | Appendix I: Endangered migratory species; Appendix II: Migratory species conserved through Agreements | Appendix I: species that are the most endangered | Critically endangered (CR); Facing an extremely high risk of extinction in the wild. |
| Dermochelys coriacea | Leatherback sea turtle Lute turtle | | Appendix I: Endangered migratory species; Appendix II: Migratory species conserved through Agreements | Appendix I: species that are the most endangered | Vulnerable (VU); Considered to be facing a high risk of extinction in the wild |
| Caretta caretta | Loggerhead sea turtle | | Appendix I: Endangered migratory species; Appendix II: Migratory species conserved through Agreements | Appendix I: species that are the most endangered | Endangered (EN); Considered to be facing a very high risk of extinction in the wild. |
| Lepidochelys olivacea | Olive ridley sea turtle | | Appendix I: Endangered migratory species; Appendix II: Migratory species conserved through Agreements | Appendix I: species that are the most endangered | Vulnerable (VU); Considered to be facing a high risk of extinction in the wild |
| Crocodylus porosus | Saltwater crocodile Saltie; Estuarine; Indo-Pacific crocodile | | Appendix II: Migratory species conserved through Agreements | Appendix I: species that are the most endangered | Least concern (LC or LR/lc); Lowest risk. Does not qualify for a more at risk category. Widespread and abundant taxa are included in this category. |
| Crocodylus johnsoni or Crocodylus johnstoni | Freshwater crocodile Australian freshwater crocodile Johnston's crocodile Freshie | | | Appendix II: may become endangered unless trade is closely controlled | Least concern (LC or LR/lc); Lowest risk. Does not qualify for a more at risk category. Widespread and abundant taxa are included in this category. |

== Seabirds ==
Threatened seabird species
| Latin name | Common names | Image | Bonn Convention classification | CITES species classification | IUCN status |
|---|---|---|---|---|---|
| Thalassarche chrysostoma | Grey-headed albatross Grey-headed mollymawk | | | Appendix II: may become endangered unless trade is closely controlled | Endangered (EN); Considered to be facing a very high risk of extinction in the wild. |
| Sternula albifrons or Sterna albifrons | Little tern | | | Appendix II: may become endangered unless trade is closely controlled | Least concern (LC or LR/lc); Lowest risk. Does not qualify for a more at risk category. Widespread and abundant taxa are included in this category. |
| Phoebetria fusca | Sooty albatross Dark-mantled sooty albatross Dark-mantled albatross | | | Appendix II: may become endangered unless trade is closely controlled | Endangered (EN); Considered to be facing a very high risk of extinction in the wild. |
| Macronectes giganteus | Southern giant petrel Antarctic giant petrel Giant fulmar Stinker; Stinkpot | | | Appendix II: may become endangered unless trade is closely controlled | Least concern (LC or LR/lc); Lowest risk. Does not qualify for a more at risk category. Widespread and abundant taxa are included in this category. |
| Diomedea exulans | Wandering albatross Snowy albatross White-winged albatross | | | Appendix II: may become endangered unless trade is closely controlled | Vulnerable (VU); Considered to be facing a high risk of extinction in the wild |
| Pterodroma arminjoniana | Trindade petrel | | | | Vulnerable (VU); Considered to be facing a high risk of extinction in the wild |
| Phaethon rubricauda | Red-tailed tropicbird | | | | Least concern (LC or LR/lc); Lowest risk. Does not qualify for a more at risk category. Widespread and abundant taxa are included in this category. |

== Marine mammals ==
Threatened marine mammal species
| Latin name | Common names | Image | Bonn Convention classification | CITES species classification | IUCN status |
|---|---|---|---|---|---|
| Arctocephalus tropicalis | Subantarctic fur seal | | | Appendix II: may become endangered unless trade is closely controlled | Least concern (LC or LR/lc); Lowest risk. Does not qualify for a more at risk category. Widespread and abundant taxa are included in this category. |
| Dugong dugon | Dugong | | Appendix II: Migratory species conserved through Agreements | Appendix I: species that are the most endangered | Vulnerable (VU); Considered to be facing a high risk of extinction in the wild |
| Balaenoptera musculus | Blue whale | | Appendix I: Endangered migratory species | Appendix I: species that are the most endangered | Endangered (EN); Considered to be facing a very high risk of extinction in the wild. |
| Tursiops truncatus | Common bottlenose dolphin | | | Appendix II: may become endangered unless trade is closely controlled | Least concern (LC or LR/lc); Lowest risk. Does not qualify for a more at risk category. Widespread and abundant taxa are included in this category. |
| Balaenoptera edeni | Bryde's whale | | Appendix II: Migratory species conserved through Agreements | Appendix I: species that are the most endangered | Data deficient (DD); Inadequate information to make a direct, or indirect, assessment of its risk of extinction. |
| Ziphius cavirostris | Cuvier's beaked whale | | | Appendix II: may become endangered unless trade is closely controlled | Least concern (LC or LR/lc); Lowest risk. Does not qualify for a more at risk category. Widespread and abundant taxa are included in this category. |
| Kogia sima formerly Kogia simus | Dwarf sperm whale | | | Appendix II: may become endangered unless trade is closely controlled | Data deficient (DD); Inadequate information to make a direct, or indirect, assessment of its risk of extinction. |
| Pseudorca crassidens | False killer whale | | | Appendix II: may become endangered unless trade is closely controlled | Data deficient (DD); Inadequate information to make a direct, or indirect, assessment of its risk of extinction. |
| Balaenoptera physalus | Fin whale | | Appendix I: Endangered migratory species; Appendix II: Migratory species conserved through Agreements | Appendix I: species that are the most endangered | Endangered (EN); Considered to be facing a very high risk of extinction in the wild. |
| Lagenodelphis hosei | Fraser's dolphin Sarawak dolphin | | | Appendix II: may become endangered unless trade is closely controlled | Least concern (LC or LR/lc); Lowest risk. Does not qualify for a more at risk category. Widespread and abundant taxa are included in this category. |
| Megaptera novaeangliae | Humpback whale | | Appendix I: Endangered migratory species | Appendix I: species that are the most endangered | Least concern (LC or LR/lc); Lowest risk. Does not qualify for a more at risk category. Widespread and abundant taxa are included in this category. |
| Sousa chinensis | Chinese white dolphin Indo-Pacific humpback dolphin 中華白海豚; Zhōnghuá bái hǎitún | | Appendix II: Migratory species conserved through Agreements | Appendix I: species that are the most endangered | Near threatened (NT or LR/nt); Is close to qualifying for or is likely to qualify for a threatened category in the near future. |
| Orcaella brevirostris | Irrawaddy dolphin | | Appendix II: Migratory species conserved through Agreements | Appendix II: may become endangered unless trade is closely controlled | Vulnerable (VU); Considered to be facing a high risk of extinction in the wild |
| Orcinus orca | Killer whale | | | Appendix II: may become endangered unless trade is closely controlled | Data deficient (DD); Inadequate information to make a direct, or indirect, assessment of its risk of extinction. |
| Globicephala melas | Long-finned pilot whale | | | Appendix II: may become endangered unless trade is closely controlled | Data deficient (DD); Inadequate information to make a direct, or indirect, assessment of its risk of extinction. |
| Indopacetus pacificus | Tropical bottlenose whale Indo-Pacific beaked whale Longman's beaked whale | | | Appendix II: may become endangered unless trade is closely controlled | Data deficient (DD); Inadequate information to make a direct, or indirect, assessment of its risk of extinction. |
| Peponocephala electra | Melon-headed whale Many-toothed blackfish Electra dolphin | | | Appendix II: may become endangered unless trade is closely controlled | Least concern (LC or LR/lc); Lowest risk. Does not qualify for a more at risk category. Widespread and abundant taxa are included in this category. |
| Balaenoptera acutorostrata | Common minke whale | | | Appendix I: species that are the most endangered | Least concern (LC or LR/lc); Lowest risk. Does not qualify for a more at risk category. Widespread and abundant taxa are included in this category. |
| Stenella attenuata | Pantropical spotted dolphin | | | Appendix II: may become endangered unless trade is closely controlled | Least concern (LC or LR/lc); Lowest risk. Does not qualify for a more at risk category. Widespread and abundant taxa are included in this category. |
| Feresa attenuata | Pygmy killer whale | | | Appendix II: may become endangered unless trade is closely controlled | Data deficient (DD); Inadequate information to make a direct, or indirect, assessment of its risk of extinction. |
| Kogia breviceps | Pygmy sperm whale | | | Appendix II: may become endangered unless trade is closely controlled | Data deficient (DD); Inadequate information to make a direct, or indirect, assessment of its risk of extinction. |
| Grampus griseus | Risso's dolphin | | | Appendix II: may become endangered unless trade is closely controlled | Least concern (LC or LR/lc); Lowest risk. Does not qualify for a more at risk category. Widespread and abundant taxa are included in this category. |
| Balaenoptera borealis | Sei whale | | Appendix I: Endangered migratory species; Appendix II: Migratory species conserved through Agreements | Appendix I: species that are the most endangered | Endangered (EN); Considered to be facing a very high risk of extinction in the wild. |
| Delphinus delphis | Short-beaked common dolphin | | | Appendix II: may become endangered unless trade is closely controlled | Least concern (LC or LR/lc); Lowest risk. Does not qualify for a more at risk category. Widespread and abundant taxa are included in this category. |
| Globicephala macrorhynchus | Short-finned pilot whale | | | Appendix II: may become endangered unless trade is closely controlled | Data deficient (DD); Inadequate information to make a direct, or indirect, assessment of its risk of extinction. |
| Physeter macrocephalus | Sperm whale | | Appendix I: Endangered migratory species; Appendix II: Migratory species conserved through Agreements | Appendix I: species that are the most endangered | Vulnerable (VU); Considered to be facing a high risk of extinction in the wild |
| Stenella longirostris | Spinner dolphin | | | Appendix II: may become endangered unless trade is closely controlled | Data deficient (DD); Inadequate information to make a direct, or indirect, assessment of its risk of extinction. |
| Stenella coeruleoalba | Striped dolphin | | | Appendix II: may become endangered unless trade is closely controlled | Least concern (LC or LR/lc); Lowest risk. Does not qualify for a more at risk category. Widespread and abundant taxa are included in this category. |
| Mesoplodon densirostris | Blainville's beaked whale | | | | |
| Steno bredanensis | Rough-toothed dolphin | | | | |
| Mesoplodon layardii | Strap-toothed whale | | | | |

== Sharks, skates and rays ==
Threatened shark, skate and ray species
| Latin name | Common names | Image | Bonn Convention classification | CITES species classification | IUCN status |
|---|---|---|---|---|---|
| Rhincodon typus | Whale shark | | Appendix II: Migratory species conserved through Agreements | Appendix II: may become endangered unless trade is closely controlled | Vulnerable (VU); Considered to be facing a high risk of extinction in the wild |
| Carcharodon carcharias | Great white shark Great white White pointer | | Appendix I: Endangered migratory species; Appendix II: Migratory species conserved through Agreements | | Vulnerable (VU); Considered to be facing a high risk of extinction in the wild |
| Orectolobus ornatus | Ornate wobbegong | | | | |
| Dalatias licha | Kitefin shark | | | | |
| Hypogaleus hyugaensis | Blacktip tope | | | | |
| Taeniura lymma | Bluespotted ribbontail ray | | | | |
| Carcharhinus leucas | Bull shark | | | | |
| Carcharhinus limbatus | Blacktip shark | | | | |
| Pseudocarcharias kamoharai | Crocodile shark | | | | |
| Dasyatis fluviorum | Estuary stingray | | | | |

== Fish ==
Threatened fish species
| Latin name | Common names | Image | Bonn Convention classification | CITES species classification | IUCN status |
|---|---|---|---|---|---|
| Cheilinus undulatus | Humphead wrasse | | | Appendix II: may become endangered unless trade is closely controlled | Endangered (EN); Considered to be facing a very high risk of extinction in the wild. |

== Seahorses ==
Threatened seahorse species
| Latin name | Common names | Image | Bonn Convention classification | CITES species classification | IUCN status |
|---|---|---|---|---|---|
| Hippocampus spp. | Seahorse subspecies | | | Appendix II: may become endangered unless trade is closely controlled | |

== Marine invertebrates ==
Threatened marine invertebrate species
| Latin name | Common names | Image | Bonn Convention classification | CITES species classification | IUCN status |
|---|---|---|---|---|---|
| Hippopus hippopus | Bear paw clam | | | Appendix II: may become endangered unless trade is closely controlled | Conservation dependent (LR/cd) the focus of a continuing taxon-specific or habitat-specific conservation program targeted towards the taxon in question, the cessation of which would result in the taxon qualifying for one of the threatened categories below within a period of five years. |
| Tridacna crocea | Boring clam Crocus clam Saffron-coloured clam | | | Appendix II: may become endangered unless trade is closely controlled | Least concern (LC or LR/lc); Lowest risk. Does not qualify for a more at risk category. Widespread and abundant taxa are included in this category. |
| Tridacna derasa | Southern giant clam | | | Appendix II: may become endangered unless trade is closely controlled | Vulnerable (VU); Considered to be facing a high risk of extinction in the wild |
| Tridacna gigas | Giant clam | | | Appendix II: may become endangered unless trade is closely controlled | Vulnerable (VU); Considered to be facing a high risk of extinction in the wild |
| Tridacna maxima | Maxima clam Small giant clam | | | Appendix II: may become endangered unless trade is closely controlled | Conservation dependent (LR/cd) the focus of a continuing taxon-specific or habitat-specific conservation program targeted towards the taxon in question, the cessation of which would result in the taxon qualifying for one of the threatened categories below within a period of five years. |
| Tridacna squamosa | Fluted giant clam Small giant clam | | | Appendix II: may become endangered unless trade is closely controlled | Conservation dependent (LR/cd) the focus of a continuing taxon-specific or habitat-specific conservation program targeted towards the taxon in question, the cessation of which would result in the taxon qualifying for one of the threatened categories below within a period of five years. |
| Scleractinia | Stony corals | | | Appendix II: may become endangered unless trade is closely controlled | |

== Island fauna ==
Threatened island fauna species under the Bonn Convention and CITES classifications
| Latin name | Common names | Image | Bonn Convention classification | CITES species classification | IUCN status |
|---|---|---|---|---|---|
| Ardeotis australis | Australian bustard | | | Appendix II: may become endangered unless trade is closely controlled | |
| Falco longipennis | Australian hobby | | | Appendix II: may become endangered unless trade is closely controlled | |
| Falco cenchroides | Nankeen kestrel | | | Appendix II: may become endangered unless trade is closely controlled | |
| Tyto novaehollandiae | Australian masked owl | | | Appendix II: may become endangered unless trade is closely controlled | |
| Tyto javanica | Eastern barn owl | | | Appendix II: may become endangered unless trade is closely controlled | |
| Elanus axillaris | Black-shouldered kite | | | Appendix II: may become endangered unless trade is closely controlled | |
| Haliastur indus | Brahminy kite | | | Appendix II: may become endangered unless trade is closely controlled | |
| Grus rubicunda | Brolga | | | Appendix II: may become endangered unless trade is closely controlled | |
| Ardeotis australis | Brown falcon | | | Appendix II: may become endangered unless trade is closely controlled | |
| Accipiter fasciatus | Brown goshawk | | | Appendix II: may become endangered unless trade is closely controlled | |
| Danaus plexippus | Monarch butterfly | | | Appendix II: may become endangered unless trade is closely controlled | |
| Falco hypoleucos | Grey falcon | | | Appendix II: may become endangered unless trade is closely controlled | |
| Accipiter novaehollandiae | Grey goshawk | | | Appendix II: may become endangered unless trade is closely controlled | |
| Aquila gurneyi | Gurney's eagle | | | Appendix II: may become endangered unless trade is closely controlled | |
| Ptiloris magnificus | Magnificent riflebird | | | Appendix II: may become endangered unless trade is closely controlled | |
| Pandion haliaetus | Osprey | | | Appendix II: may become endangered unless trade is closely controlled | |
| Aviceda subcristata | Pacific baza | | | Appendix II: may become endangered unless trade is closely controlled | |
| Falco peregrinus | Peregrine falcon | | | Appendix II: may become endangered unless trade is closely controlled | |
| Trichoglossus haematodus | Rainbow lorikeet | | | Appendix II: may become endangered unless trade is closely controlled | |
| Tyto capensis | African grass owl | | | Appendix II: may become endangered unless trade is closely controlled | |
| Calyptorhynchus banksii | Red-tailed black cockatoo | | | Appendix II: may become endangered unless trade is closely controlled | |
| Ninox rufa | Rufous owl | | | Appendix II: may become endangered unless trade is closely controlled | |
| Ninox novaeseelandiae | Southern boobook | | | Appendix II: may become endangered unless trade is closely controlled | |
| Cacatua galerita | Sulphur-crested cockatoo | | | Appendix II: may become endangered unless trade is closely controlled | |
| Circus approximans | Swamp harrier | | | Appendix II: may become endangered unless trade is closely controlled | |
| Manucodia keraudrenii | Trumpet manucode | | | Appendix II: may become endangered unless trade is closely controlled | |
| Ptiloris victoriae | Victoria's riflebird | | | Appendix II: may become endangered unless trade is closely controlled | |
| Aquila audax | Wedge-tailed eagle | | | Appendix II: may become endangered unless trade is closely controlled | |
| Haliastur sphenurus | Whistling kite | | | Appendix II: may become endangered unless trade is closely controlled | |
| Butastur teesa | White-eyed buzzard | | | Appendix II: may become endangered unless trade is closely controlled | |

Threatened island fauna species under the JAMBA and CAMBA classifications
| Latin name | Common names | Image | JAMBA classification | CAMBA classification | IUCN status |
|---|---|---|---|---|---|
| Sterna hirundo | Common tern | | | | |
| Limosa lapponica | Bar-tailed godwit | | | | |
| Chlidonias niger | Black tern | | | | |
| Sterna sumatrana | Black-naped tern | | | | |
| Limosa limosa | Black-tailed godwit | | | | |
| Onychoprion anaethetus formerly Sterna anaethetus | Bridled tern | | | | |
| Sula leucogaster | Brown booby | | | | |
| Charadrius asiaticus | Caspian plover | | | | |
| Hydroprogne caspia, formerly Sterna caspia | Caspian tern | | | | |
| Ardea ibis | Cattle egret | | | | |
| Anous stolidus | Brown noddy Common noddy | | | | |
| Actitis hypoleucos | Common sandpiper | | | | |
| Thalasseus bergii | Greater crested tern Crested tern Swift tern | | | | |
| Calidris ferruginea | Curlew sandpiper | | | | |
| Numenius madagascariensis | Far Eastern curlew | | | | |
| Egretta sacra | Pacific reef heron Eastern reef heron Eastern reef egret | | | | |
| Puffinus carneipes | Flesh-footed shearwater | | | | |
| Plegadis falcinellus | Glossy ibis | | | | |
| Ardea alba | Great egret Common egret Large egret Great white heron | | | | |
| Calidris tenuirostris | Great knot | | | | |
| Fregata minor | Great frigatebird | | | | |
| Charadrius leschenaultii | Greater sand plover | | | | |
| Tringa nebularia | Common greenshank | | | | |
| Pluvialis squatarola | Grey plover Black-bellied plover | | | | |
| Heteroscelus brevipes formerly Heteroscelus brevipes | Grey-tailed tattler Polynesian tattler | | | | |
| Sterna bengalensis | Lesser crested tern | | | | |
| Pluvialis fulva | Pacific golden plover | | | | |
| Charadrius mongolus | Lesser sand plover | | | | |
| Numenius minutus | Little curlew | | | | |
| Sterna albifrons | Little tern | | | | |
| Tringa stagnatilis | Marsh sandpiper | | | | |
| Sula dactylatra | Masked booby | | | | |
| Cuculus saturatus | Himalayan cuckoo | | | | |
| Gallinago stenura | Pin-tailed snipe | | | | |
| Calidris canutus | Red knot | | | | |
| Sula sula | Red-footed booby | | | | |
| Calidris ruficollis | Red-necked stint | | | | |
| Arenaria interpres | Ruddy turnstone | | | | |
| Calidris alba | Sanderling | | | | |
| Calidris acuminata | Sharp-tailed sandpiper | | | | |
| Gallinago megala | Swinhoe's snipe | | | | |
| Xenus cinereus | Terek sandpiper | | | | |
| Heteroscelus brevipes | Grey-tailed tattler | | | | |
| Puffinus pacificus | Wedge-tailed shearwater | | | | |
| Numenius phaeopus | Whimbrel | | | | |
| Ardea alba | Great egret Common egret Large egret Great white heron | | | | |
| Haliaeetus leucogaster | White-bellied sea eagle | | | | |
| Phaethon lepturus | White-tailed tropicbird | | | | |
| Hirundapus caudacutus | White-throated needletail | | | | |
| Chlidonias leucopterus | White-winged tern | | | | |
| Oceanites oceanicus | Wilson's storm petrel | | | | |
| Tringa glareola | Wood sandpiper | | | | |

== See also ==
- Environmental threats to the Great Barrier Reef
