= Tridacna elongatissima =

Conservation status
- Data Deficient (IUCN 3.1)

Scientific classification
- Kingdom: Animalia
- Phylum: Mollusca
- Class: Bivalvia
- Order: Cardiida
- Family: Cardiidae
- Genus: Tridacna
- Species: T. elongatissima

Binomial name
- Tridacna elongatissima Bianconi, 1856

Synonyms
- Tridacna (Chametrachea) elongatissima Bianconi, 1856

Species of bivalve

Tridacna elongatissima is a species of bivalve that belongs to the subfamily Tridacninae.

All known members of the giant clam genus Tridacna are found exclusively within the Indo-West Pacific and the Western Indian Ocean. This species can be found off the coast of Mozambique and Madagascar. This species can also be found at Réunion in the Mascarene Islands.

== Taxonomy ==
This species was described in 1856. It was thought that this species was a taxonomic synonym to Tridacna maxima however it was recognized later on as its own separate species.

It is a sister species of Tridacna squamosina. These two species are then a sister lineage to Tridacna rosewateri.
