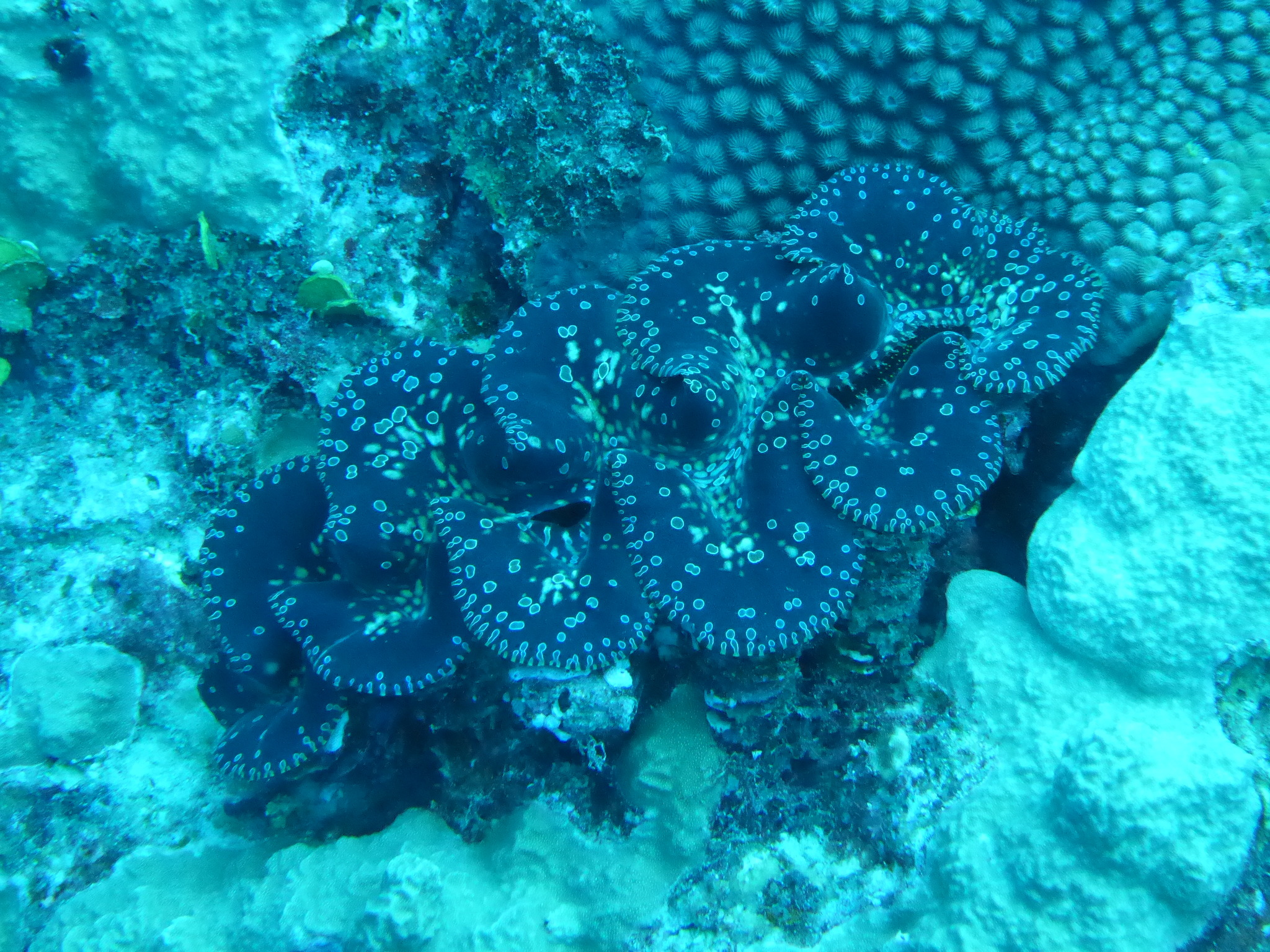

Conservation status
- Least Concern (IUCN 3.1)
- CITES Appendix II

Scientific classification
- Kingdom: Animalia
- Phylum: Mollusca
- Class: Bivalvia
- Order: Cardiida
- Family: Cardiidae
- Genus: Tridacna
- Species: T. noae

Binomial name
- Tridacna noae (Röding, 1798)

Synonyms
- Tridachnes noae Röding, 1798

= Tridacna noae =

Species of bivalve

Tridacna noae, also known as Noah’s giant clam or the Teardrop giant clam, is a species of giant clam. Up until recently, T. noae was confused with the small giant clam Tridacna maxima, but is now known to be its own independent species. It has a broad distribution in the Indo-Pacific.

As with all giant clams, populations of T. noae, are declining due to human exploitation of flesh for consumption, shells, and as aquarium pets. T. noae and all members of Tridacninae are considered endangered, and have been since 1985.

== Taxonomy ==
T. noae are marine bivalve molluscs in the subfamily Tridacninae, also known as giant clams. T. noae was originally described and named by Röding (1798) based on figures in Chemnitz (1784).

== Description ==
T. noae have a physical appearance typical to that of most bivalves, especially those in the Tridacninae, or giant clam, subfamily. T. noae typically have a shell length between 6–20 cm, and shells usually have 5-7 radial ribs. Mantle colors may vary and include brown, yellow, blue, and green. Black hyaline organs, or eyes, are arranged along the border of the mantle, along with a thin, white margin and ocellate spots.

== Confusion with T. maxima ==
T. noae was first recognized as a cryptic species from T. maxima in Taiwan and Japan by Tang (2005) and Kubo and Iwai (2007) respectively. DNA sequencing characterizes the two as distinct species. T. noae is even closer related to other members of Tridacninae than T. maxima according to rRNA evidence. While T. noae is very similar in appearance to T. maxima, there are key differences that distinguish between the two, such as shell morphology, mantle pattern, and mantle coloration. The mantles of T. noae have ocellate spots with a thin, white border around the edge, along with hyaline organs—also known as eyes—that have an arrangement distinctive of the species. Although proven to be an unreliable distinguishing factor, T. noae usually have a higher number, between 5 and 7, of radial ribs on their shell, compared with between 4 and 6 in T. maxima. Confusion between the two species has led to overestimated population densities of T. maxima and potentially misleading conclusions in studies of T. maxima populations.

== Distribution ==
T. noae have a broad distribution, mainly Indo-West Pacific, that overlaps with that of T. maxima. T. noae live in shallow waters, up to 20 meters in depth, and are typically found on the edges and crests of coral reefs, attached by byssal threads. T. noae populations were first recognized in Taiwan and Japan, but have been observed as far west as Christmas Island. Mitochondrial DNA markers break up the distribution of T. noae into three groups: east Indo-Malay archipelago to Western Australia, Melanesia to Micronesia, and Central Polynesia.

== Threats and Conservation ==
All giant clams, including T. noae, have been listed in Appendix II of the Convention on International Trade in Endangered Species since 1985 and on the International Union for Conservation of Nature (IUCN) Red List since 1986. Populations of T. noae have been on a decline due to human exploitation of the species. Known colloquially as the “teardrop” clam, T. noae are exploited for their flesh for consumption, their shells for jewelry and collections, and as aquarium pets. Conservation efforts have been made to replenish the wild populations of T. noae through breeding in captivity, with the additional goal of culture for commercial markets.
