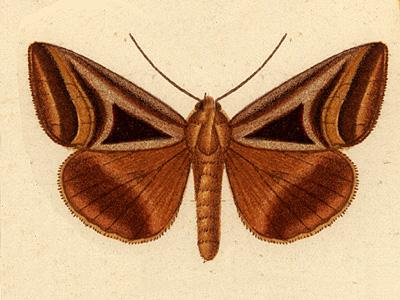

Scientific classification
- Kingdom: Animalia
- Phylum: Arthropoda
- Class: Insecta
- Order: Lepidoptera
- Superfamily: Noctuoidea
- Family: Noctuidae (?)
- Genus: Trigonodes
- Species: T. lucasii

Binomial name
- Trigonodes lucasii Guenée, 1852

Synonyms
- Chalciope lucasi (Guenée, 1852); Trigonodes problematica Walker 1858

= Trigonodes lucasii =

Species of moth

Trigonodes lucasii is a moth of the family Noctuidae first described by Achille Guenée in 1852. It is found in the Caribbean, including the Dominican Republic, the Antilles and Jamaica.
