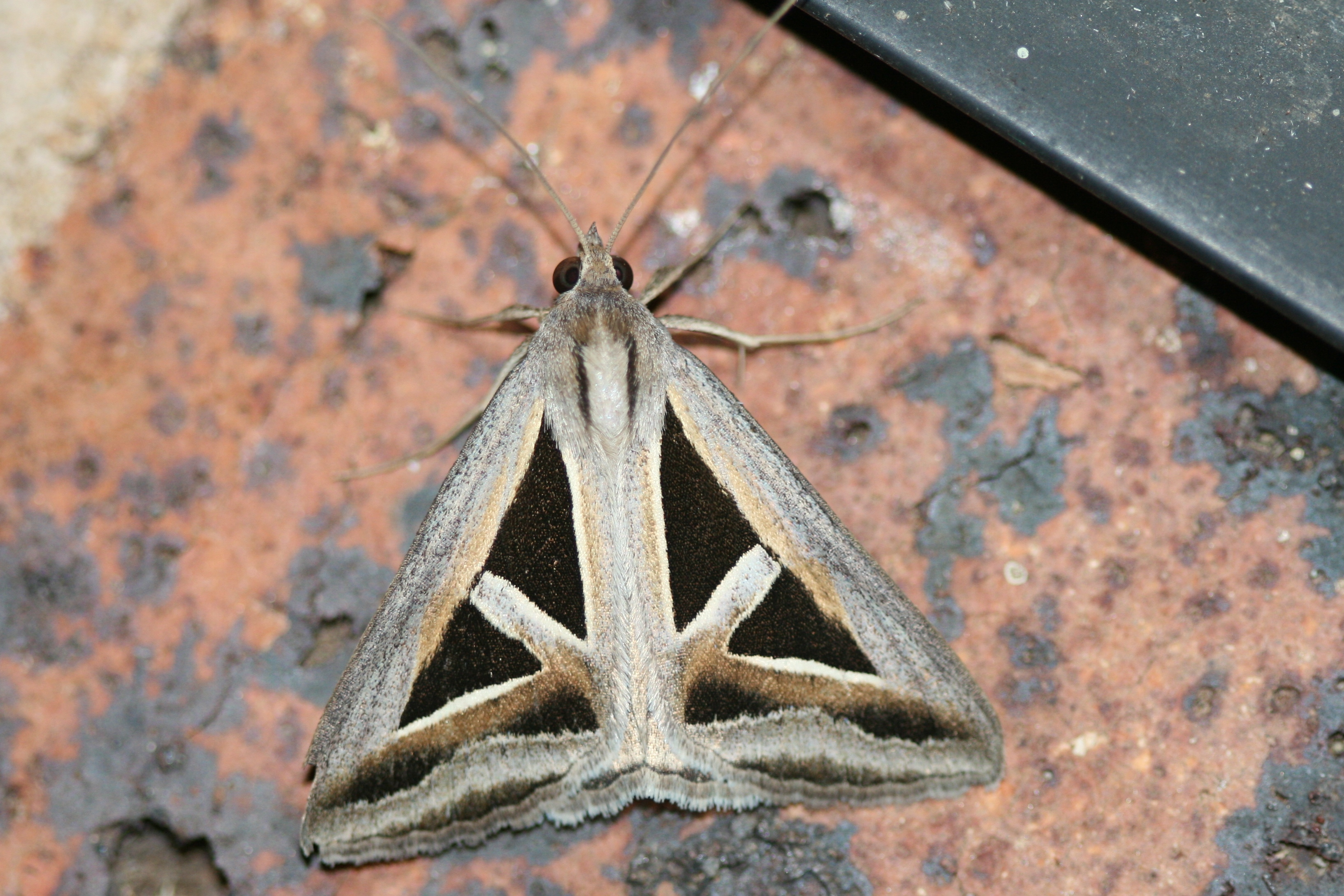
- Trigonodes hyppasia

Scientific classification
- Kingdom: Animalia
- Phylum: Arthropoda
- Clade: Pancrustacea
- Class: Insecta
- Order: Lepidoptera
- Superfamily: Noctuoidea
- Family: Noctuidae (?)
- Subfamily: Catocalinae
- Genus: Trigonodes; Guenée in Boisduval & Guenée, 1852

= Trigonodes =

Genus of moths

Trigonodes is a genus of moths erected by Achille Guenée in 1852. The genus was in the family Noctuidae, but is now mostly classified in the family Erebidae, along with all of the former members of the families Arctiidae and Lymantriidae. This re-classification has not yet met with general consensus, and many resources and publications still follow the older classification scheme.

== Species ==
Species list from ZipcodeZoo:

- Trigonodes acutata (Guenée, 1852)
- Trigonodes angolensis (Weymer, 1908)
- Trigonodes bougainvillensis (Strand 1917)
- Trigonodes caunindana (Strand 1920)
- Trigonodes cephise (Cramer, [1779])
- Trigonodes cephisoides (Strand 1917)
- Trigonodes compar (Walker 1858)
- Trigonodes deliana (Stoll, 1790)
- Trigonodes disjuncta (Moore, 1882)
- Trigonodes exportata (Guené", [1852])
- Trigonodes hoenei (Berio 1964)
- Trigonodes hyppasia (Cramer, [1779])
- Trigonodes hyppasiana (Strand, 1917)
- Trigonodes inacuta (Guenée, 1852)
- Trigonodes lucasii (Guenée, 1852)
- Trigonodes maxima (Guenée, 1852)
- Trigonodes problematica (Walker, 1858)
- Trigonodes pusilla (Holland, 1894)
- Trigonodes saina (Swinhoe, 1918)
- Trigonodes trigonodesia (Strand, 1915)
