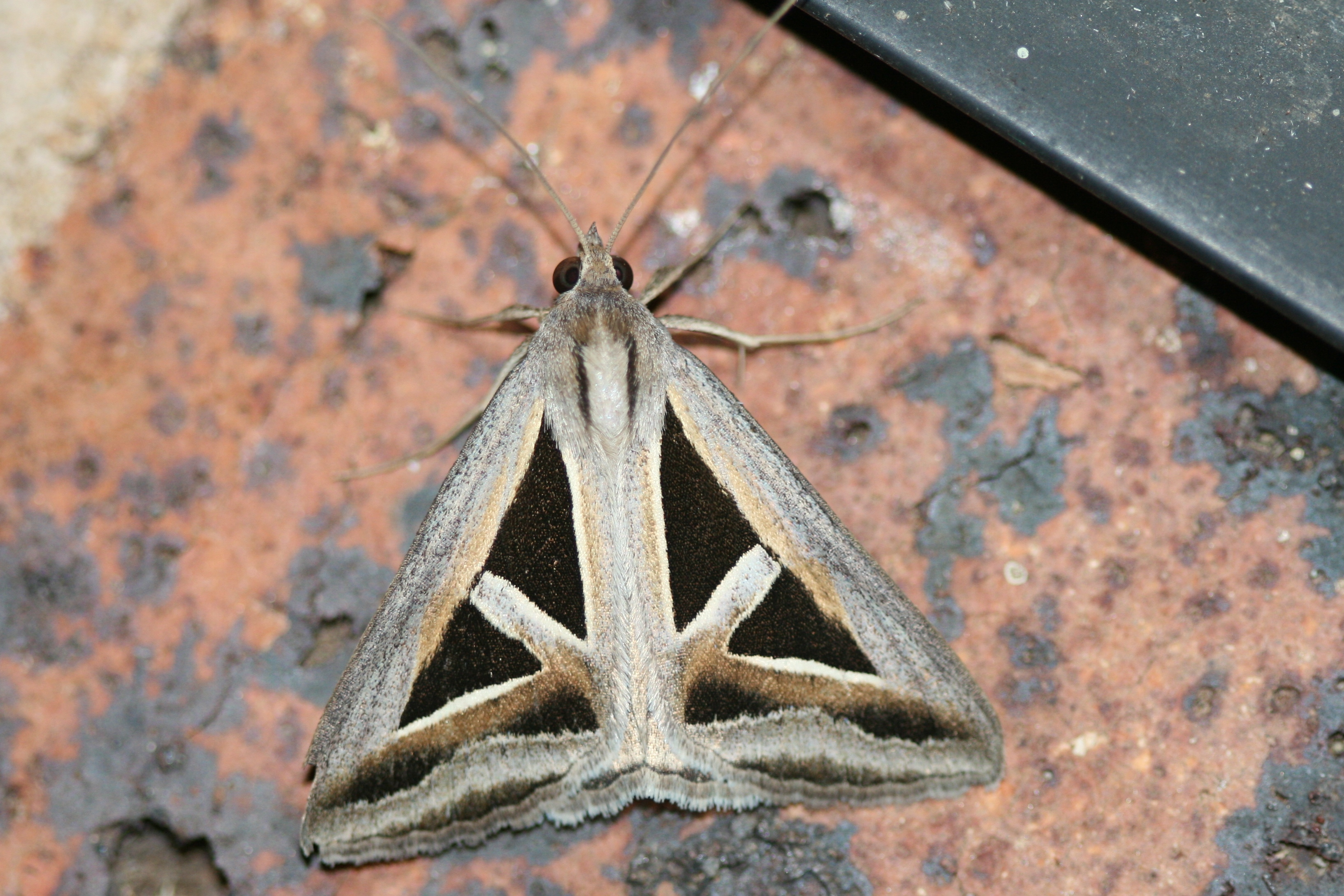

Scientific classification
- Domain: Eukaryota
- Kingdom: Animalia
- Phylum: Arthropoda
- Class: Insecta
- Order: Lepidoptera
- Superfamily: Noctuoidea
- Family: Noctuidae (?)
- Genus: Trigonodes
- Species: T. hyppasia

Binomial name
- Trigonodes hyppasia (Cramer, 1779)

Synonyms
- Noctua hyppasia Cramer, 1779; Chalciope hyppasia; Phalaena deliana Stoll, 1790; Chaciope deliana (Stoll, 1790); Ophiusa anfractuosa Boisduval, 1833; Trigonodes acutata Guenée, 1852; Trigonodes exportata Guenée, 1852; Trigonodes inacuta Guenée, 1852; Trigonodes compar Walker, 1858

= Trigonodes hyppasia =

Triangles

Species of moth

Trigonodes hyppasia, the triangles or semi-looper, is a moth in the family Erebidae. The species was first described by Pieter Cramer in 1779. It is largely cosmopolitan, found throughout Borneo, Fiji, India, Maldives, Nepal, Sri Lanka, São Tomé and Príncipe, Taiwan, Thailand, Zimbabwe, northern Australia, and almost all African countries.

== Taxonomy ==
The moth family Noctuidae are mostly classified in the family Erebidae now, along with all of the former members of the families Arctiidae and Lymantriidae. This re-classification has not yet met with general consensus, and many resources and publications still follow the older classification scheme.

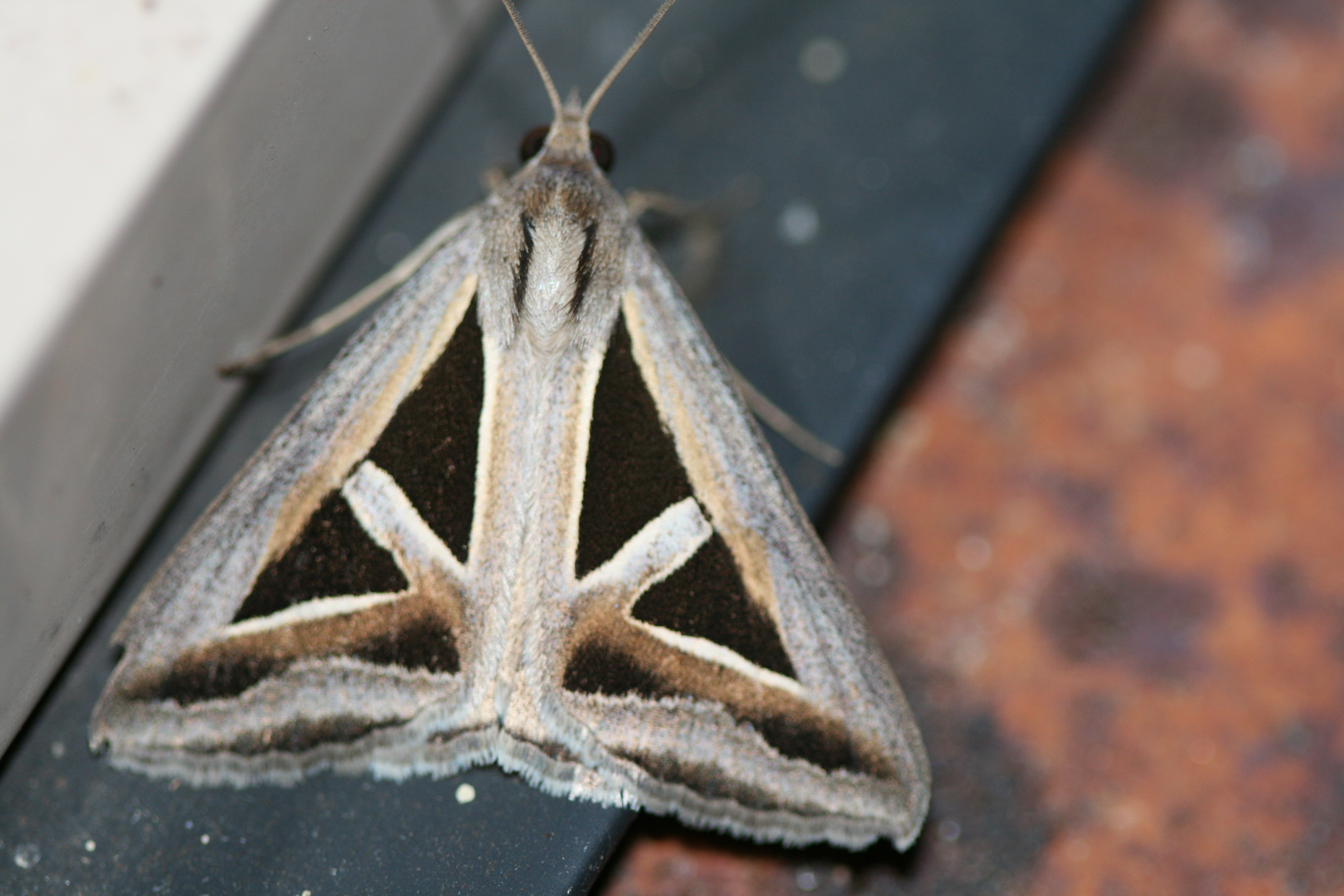

== Description ==
The wingspan is about 30–46 mm. Antennae of male ciliated. Mid and hind tibia hairy. Body pale ochreous brown, slightly suffused with fuscous or dark grey brown. Forewings with a large black white-edged triangular patch easily distinguished below the cell from near base to towards outer angle. A similar smaller patch found beyond the cell on vein 5, with some pale fulvous behind it. A slightly sinuous submarginal pale line with patches of black suffusion found inside it and a series of black specks beyond it. A dark marginal line can be seen as well. Hindwings with indistinct medial line and fuscous suffused outer area.

Larva has yellow upper half and brown ventral part. The yellow part is broken by longitudinal brown bands, which faints towards posterior and becomes intensive again in prolegs. Eggs olive green and speckled rusty red. First few instars are green with three lateral purple brown lines. Late instars are yellowish. Pupa within a slight cocoon of white silk, which spun amongst leaves.

The larvae feed on Chrysopogon, Eleusine Glycine, Indigofera, Kummerovia, Medicago, Phaseolus, Rhynchosia and Nephelium species.
