= Tridacna mbalavuana =

Conservation status
- Endangered (IUCN 3.1)
- CITES Appendix II

Scientific classification
- Kingdom: Animalia
- Phylum: Mollusca
- Class: Bivalvia
- Order: Cardiida
- Family: Cardiidae
- Genus: Tridacna
- Species: T. mbalavuana

Binomial name
- Tridacna mbalavuana Ladd, 1934

Synonyms
- Tridacna (Chametrachea) mbalavuana Ladd, 1934; Tridacna (Tridacna) mbalavuana Ladd, 1934; Tridacna tevoroa Lucas, Ledua & Braley, 1990

Species of bivalve

Tridacna mbalavuana, the tevoro clam, is a species of bivalve in the family Cardiidae. It is found in Fiji and Tonga. It is currently listed on the IUCN Red List of Threatened Species.
