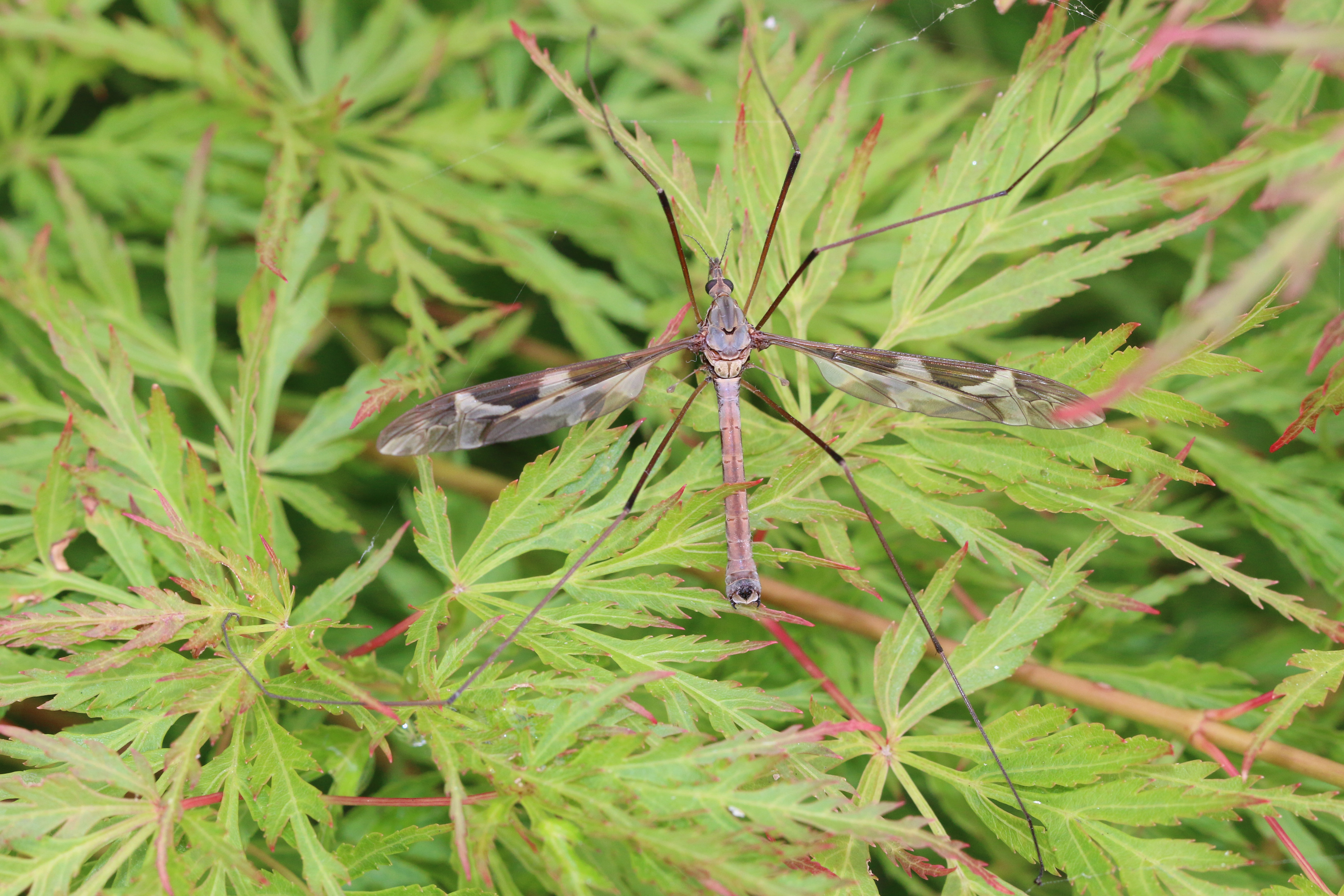

Scientific classification
- Kingdom: Animalia
- Phylum: Arthropoda
- Clade: Pancrustacea
- Class: Insecta
- Order: Diptera
- Family: Tipulidae
- Genus: Tipula
- Subgenus: Acutipula
- Species: T. maxima

Binomial name
- Tipula maxima Poda, 1761

Synonyms
- Tipula sinuata Fabricius, 1775; Tipula gigantea Schrank, 1776; Tipula nubilosa Harris, 1776; Tipula hortorum Herbst, 1787; Tipula pseudogigantea Strobl, 1900

= Tipula maxima =

Species of fly

Tipula maxima is a species of true cranefly.

== Distribution ==
Tipula maxima is widespread throughout the western Palaearctic.
