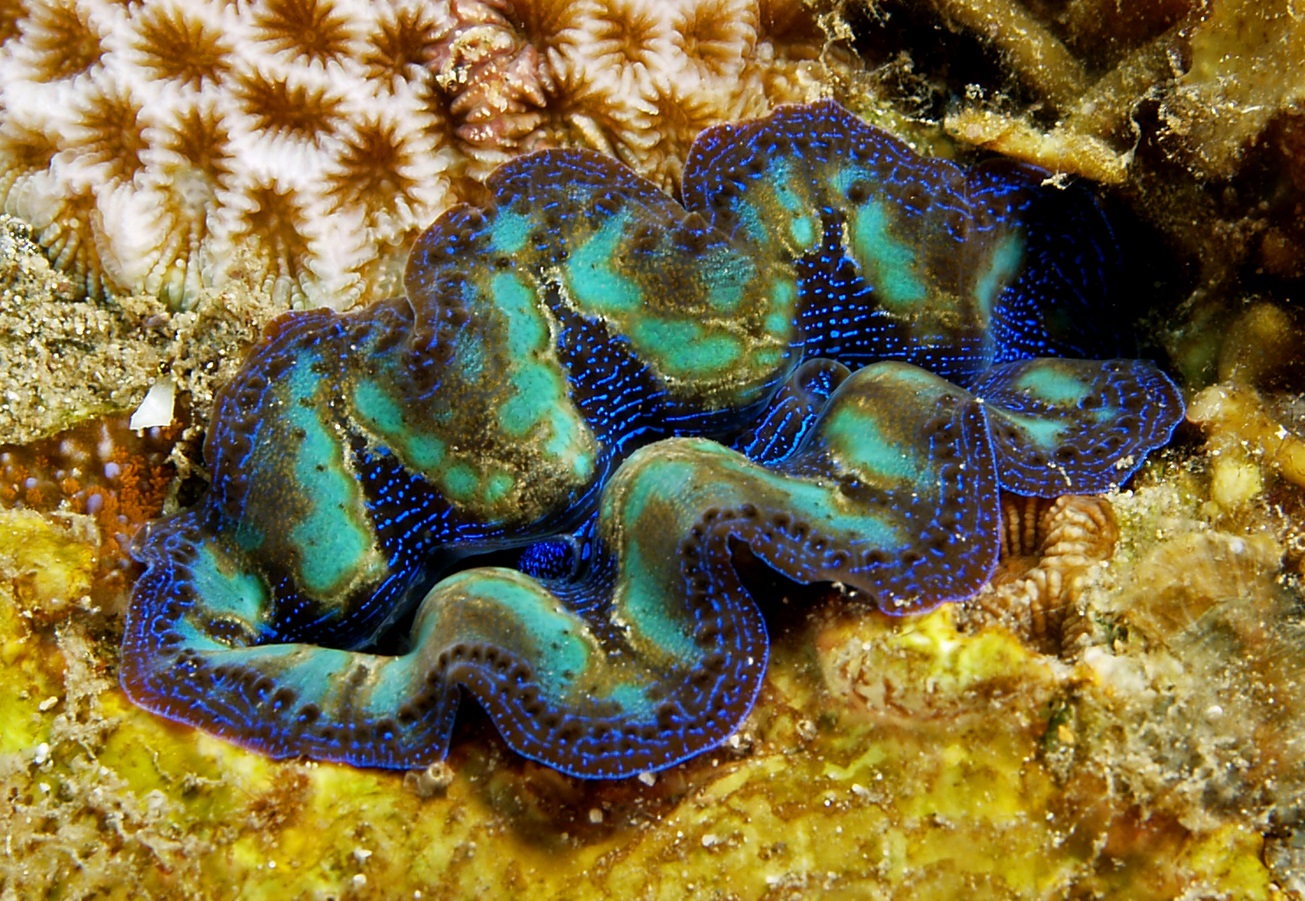
- Boring clam with mantle extended

Conservation status
- Least Concern (IUCN 3.1)
- CITES Appendix II

Scientific classification
- Kingdom: Animalia
- Phylum: Mollusca
- Class: Bivalvia
- Order: Cardiida
- Family: Cardiidae
- Subfamily: Tridacninae
- Genus: Tridacna
- Species: T. crocea

Binomial name
- Tridacna crocea Lamarck, 1819

Synonyms
- Tridacna (Chametrachea) crocea Lamarck, 1819 · alternate representation; Tridacna cumingii Reeve, 1862 junior subjective synonym; Tridacna ferruginea Reeve, 1862 junior subjective synonym

= Tridacna crocea =

Species of bivalve

Tridacna crocea, the boring clam, crocus clam, crocea clam or saffron-coloured clam, is a species of bivalve in the family Cardiidae. It is native to the Indo-Pacific region. It is occasionally found in the aquarium trade where it is often simply referred to as crocea.

== Description ==
The boring clam is the smallest clam in the subfamily Tridacninae and grows to a maximum shell size of 15 cm (6 in). It has two, thick valves joined by a hinge which is typically between a third and less than a half of the width of the shell. Typically shells are slightly to moderately elongate, and the animal is strongly inflated, especially near the hinge. The upper valve has six to ten flattish folds which interlock at the margin with similar folds on the lower valve so that they can clamp together and the shell can close tightly. The lower valve has slits through which the byssal threads emerge which secure the animal to the seabed. This clam burrows into the substrate and this process tends to wear away the outer surface of the valves and smooth them off. They also may become distorted by burrowing into substrates of uneven hardness.

The colour of the valves is generally greyish-white, sometimes with a hint of pink-orange, yellow or orange colour—this colouration can form a band near the top margin, especially on the interior surface. The mantle, the soft body wall which covers the animal's internal organs, projects from between the valves when they are open and is brightly coloured. It can be various shades of blue, green, purple, gold, orange or brown, often patterned with spots, stripes or squiggles. It has many small protrusions on the exposed surface and a line of simple eyes near the margin. The inhalent siphon, through which water is drawn into the shell, is surrounded by many small tentacles and the exhalent siphon is often long and tubular.

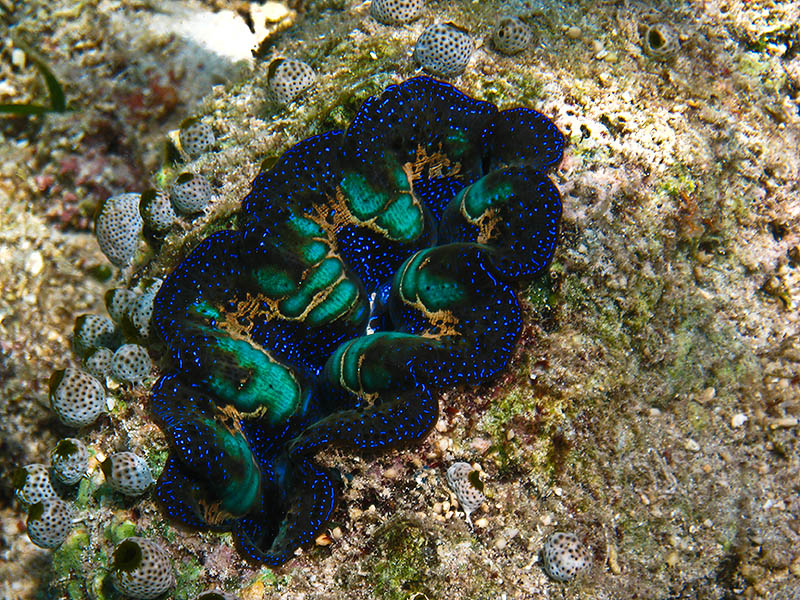

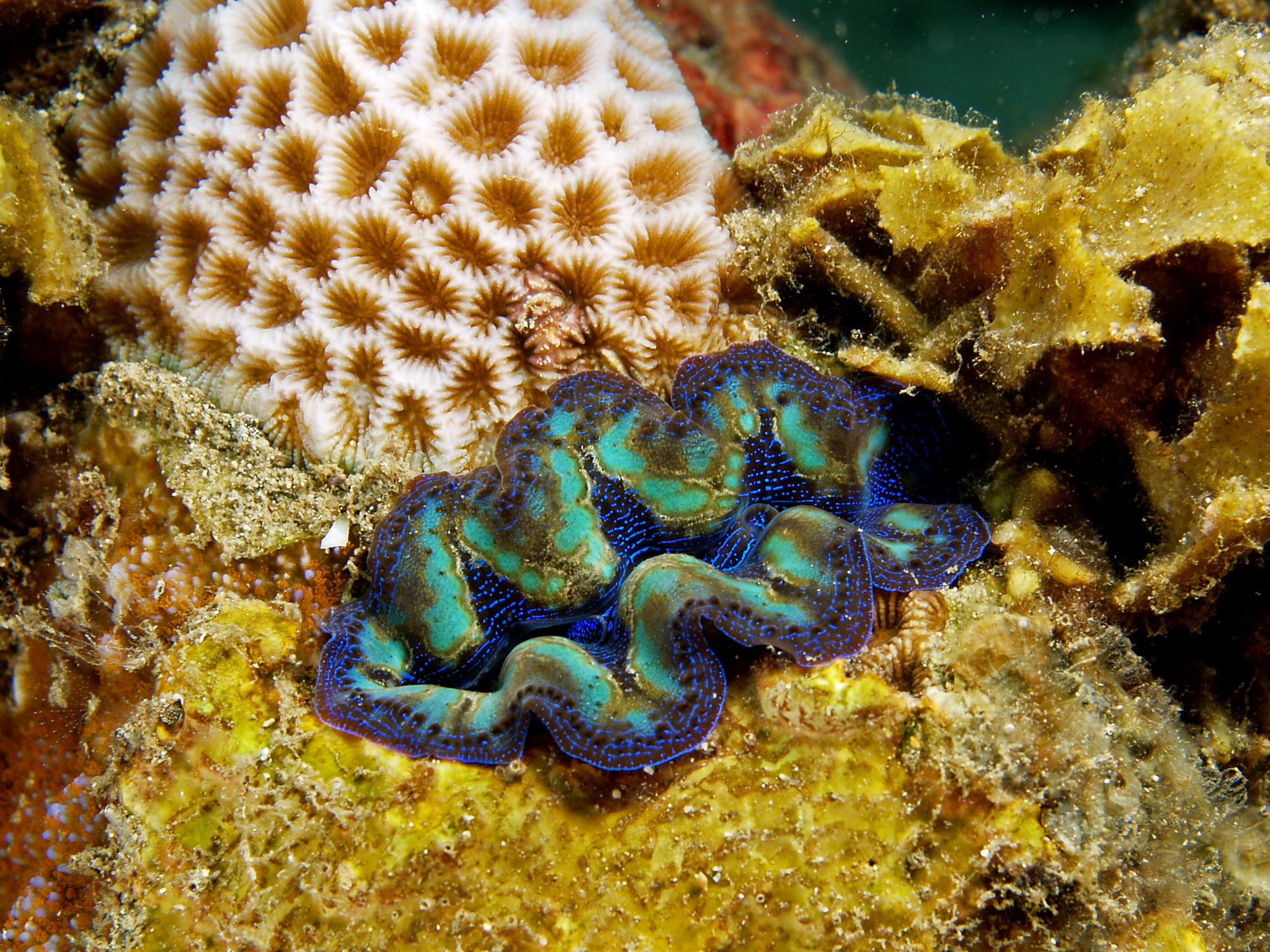

Left valve

== Distribution and habitat ==
The boring clam is native to the Indo-Pacific. Its range extends from Malaysia, Vietnam and Japan to Indonesia, the Philippines, Palau, New Guinea, Australia, the Solomon Islands and Vanuatu. At one time it was known from Guam and the Northern Mariana Islands but it may now be locally extinct in these locations. Its typical habitat is embedded in massive corals.
