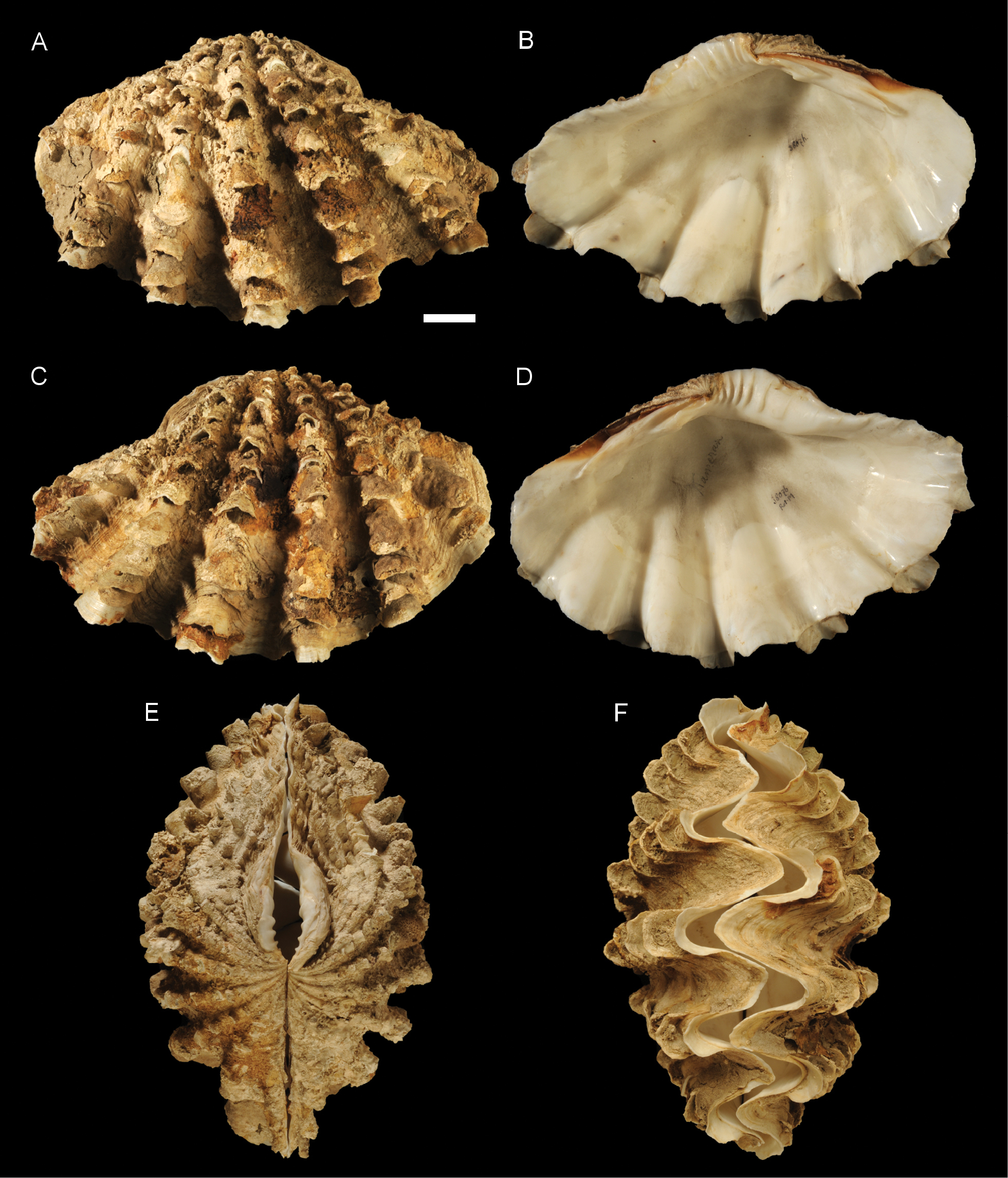

Conservation status
- Endangered (IUCN 3.1)

Scientific classification
- Kingdom: Animalia
- Phylum: Mollusca
- Class: Bivalvia
- Order: Cardiida
- Family: Cardiidae
- Genus: Tridacna
- Species: T. squamosina

Binomial name
- Tridacna squamosina Sturany, 1899

Synonyms
- Tridacna elongata var. squamosina Sturany, 1899; Tridacna (Chametrachea) squamosina Sturany, 1899; Tridacna (Chametrachea) costata Roa-Quiaoit, Kochzius, Jantzen, Zibdah & Richter, 2008; Tridacna costata Roa-Quiaoit, Kochzius, Jantzen, Zibdah & Richter, 2008

= Tridacna squamosina =

Species of bivalve

Tridacna squamosina is a species of the Tridacna genus, the giant clams. These animals are bivalve mollusks belonging to the family Cardiidae identified by Sturany 1899.

In 2008 Roa-Quiaoit, Kochzius, Jantzen, Zibdah & Richter identified what they believed was a new species of giant clam they called Tridacna costata, however in 2011 Markus Huber and Anita Eschner examined a collection of Rudolf Sturanys specimens, held in the Natural History Museum, Vienna, that had remained not properly identified for over 100 years and discovered it was actually Tridacna squamosina. The collection held seven syntypes were identified and Tridacna squamosina was accepted and Tridacna costata formally synonymized.

== Physical characteristics ==
Tridacna squamosina is a bivalve mollusk with an elongated shell. The shell has a few folds compared to other bivalve tridacnas, about 5–7 of the on each shell. The upper shell has somewhat large tooth-like formations projecting form its outer edge. Even when compressed as much as they can be, the T. squamosina has major spaces between the two halves of its shell, especially in the areas of the tooth-like formations. The mollusk also has a well-sized byssus upon its bottom, quite similar to the T. maxima. Common for other bivalve giant clams, the T. squamosina's papillose mantle tissue varies a wide array of hues and colors, which range in various patterns. Unlike the T. maxima or the T. squamosa however, these formations are much more pronounced in the T. squamosina; although some T. maxima and T. squamosa do bear relatively few amounts of papillae. All three's siphon is also ringed with tentacles.

== Habitat ==
The species is distributed across the Tropical areas of the Indo-Pacific, although when originally formally described it was thought to only exist in the Red Sea where it is actually rare. It inhabits shallow reef areas and various seagrass beds, usually 0–5 m (0–16 ft) below the surface. T. squamosina is most concentrated around Oceania and Southeast Asia—with the most being around the Philippines and the Malay Archipelago. T. squamosina is also found in areas of the Red Sea. In 2005, a student found a giant clam found in the Gulf of Aqaba. An expedition of the 19th century also collected specimens of the same species in the Gulf of Aqaba and of the coast of modern day Yemen. Yet these were taxonomically identified as the Tridacna elongata with the variation squamosina. The species is also reported to be abundant near the Bazaruto Archipelago off the coast of Southern Mozambique. A survey showed that the T. squamosina makes up only 1% of all tridacnas located in the Red Sea, making the species a rarity in the place they were discovered in. The species also is reported to make up 80% of all tridacnid fossils in the area. This idea leads scientists to believe that the species was heavily hunted nearly 100,000 years ago, when humans had only begun their occupation of the area.
