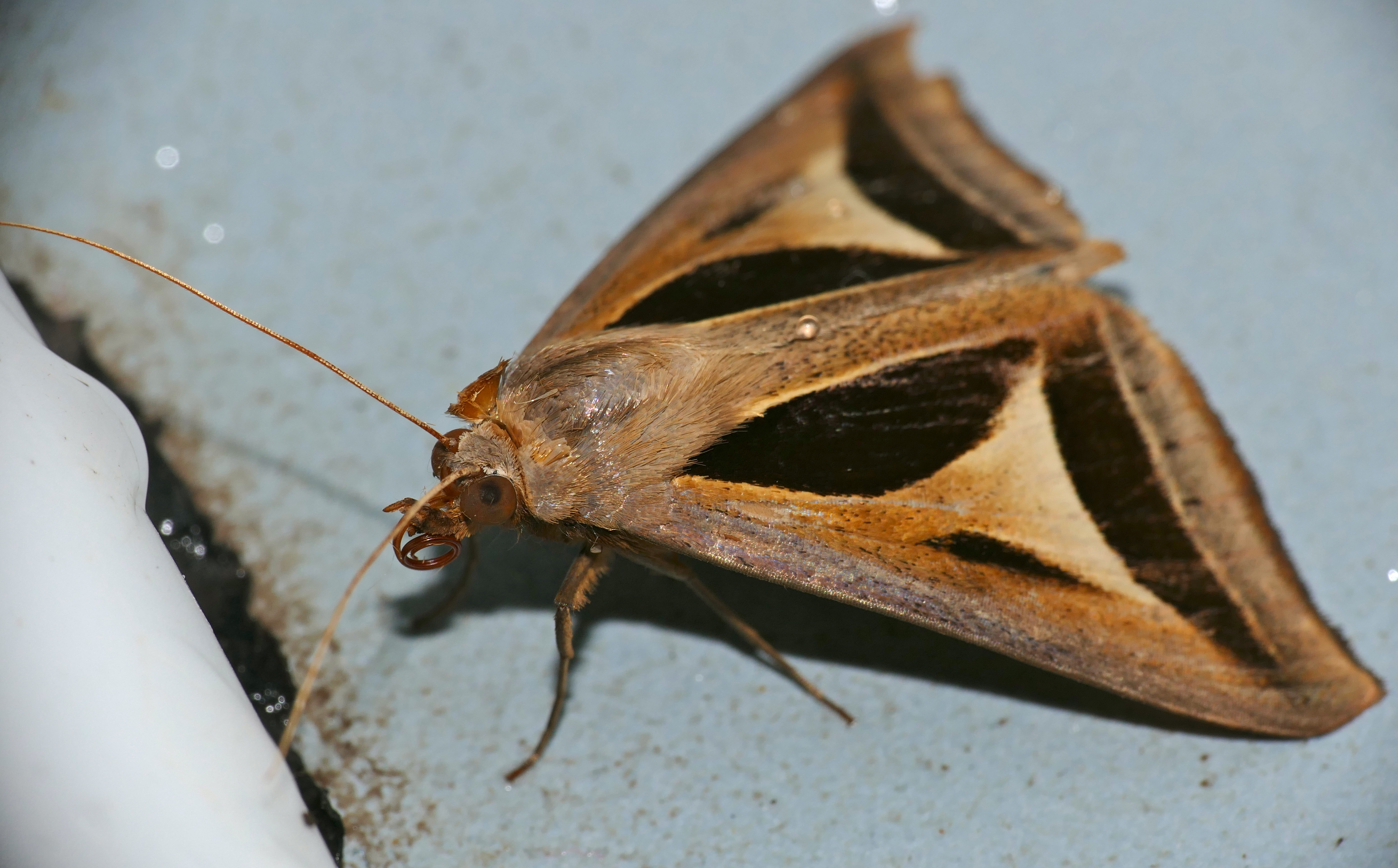
- Gunung Gading NP, Sarawak, MALAYSIA

Scientific classification
- Domain: Eukaryota
- Kingdom: Animalia
- Phylum: Arthropoda
- Class: Insecta
- Order: Lepidoptera
- Superfamily: Noctuoidea
- Family: Noctuidae (?)
- Genus: Trigonodes
- Species: T. cephise

Binomial name
- Trigonodes cephise (Cramer, [1779])

Synonyms
- Noctua cephise (Cramer, [1779]); Trigonodes maxima Guenée, 1852; Chalciope cephise ab. cephisoides Strand, 1917; Chalciope saina Swinhoe, 1918; Trigonodes saina (Swinhoe, 1918); Chalciope cephise cephisiodes Gaede, 1938

= Trigonodes cephise =

Species of moth

Trigonodes cephise is a moth of the family Noctuidae first described by Pieter Cramer in 1779. It is found from the Indo-Australian tropics to northern Australia, the Caroline Islands, Samoa and New Caledonia, Nias and other islands on the south-west of Sumatra.

The larvae feed on Vigna species, including Vigna marina.

== Subspecies ==
- Trigonodes cephise cephise
- Trigonodes cephise saina (Nias and other islands on the south-west of Sumatra)
