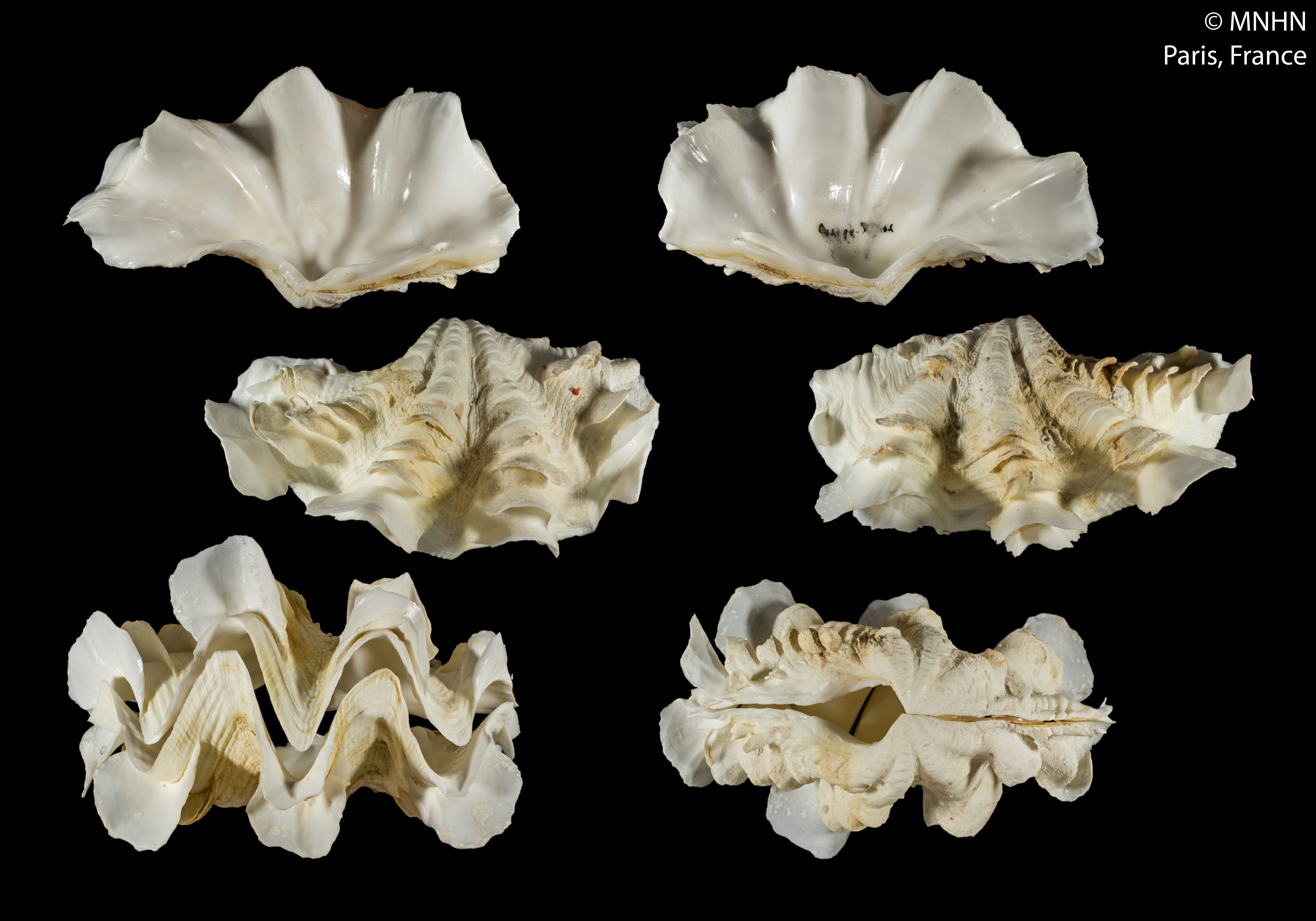
- Preserved specimen of Tridacna rosewateri

Conservation status
- Data Deficient (IUCN 3.1)
- CITES Appendix II

Scientific classification
- Kingdom: Animalia
- Phylum: Mollusca
- Class: Bivalvia
- Order: Cardiida
- Family: Cardiidae
- Subfamily: Tridacninae
- Genus: Tridacna
- Species: T. rosewateri

Binomial name
- Tridacna rosewateri Sirenho & Scarlato, 1991

Synonyms
- Tridacna (Chametrachea) lorenzi K. Monsecour, 2016 junior subjective synonym; Tridacna (Chametrachea) rosewateri Sirenko & Scarlato, 1991 · alternate representation; Tridacna lorenzi K. Monsecour, 2016 ·

= Tridacna rosewateri =

Species of bivalve

Tridacna rosewateri, or Rosewater's giant clam, is a species of marine bivalve in the family Cardiidae. For a while, the species was thought to be extinct, until it was rediscovered in 2020. It was thought to be a new species, Tridacna lorenzi, but further research has shown that it is actually Rosewater's giant clam.

== Distribution ==
It is endemic to Mauritius. Its type locality was given as the "Saya de Malha Bank, Indian Ocean."
