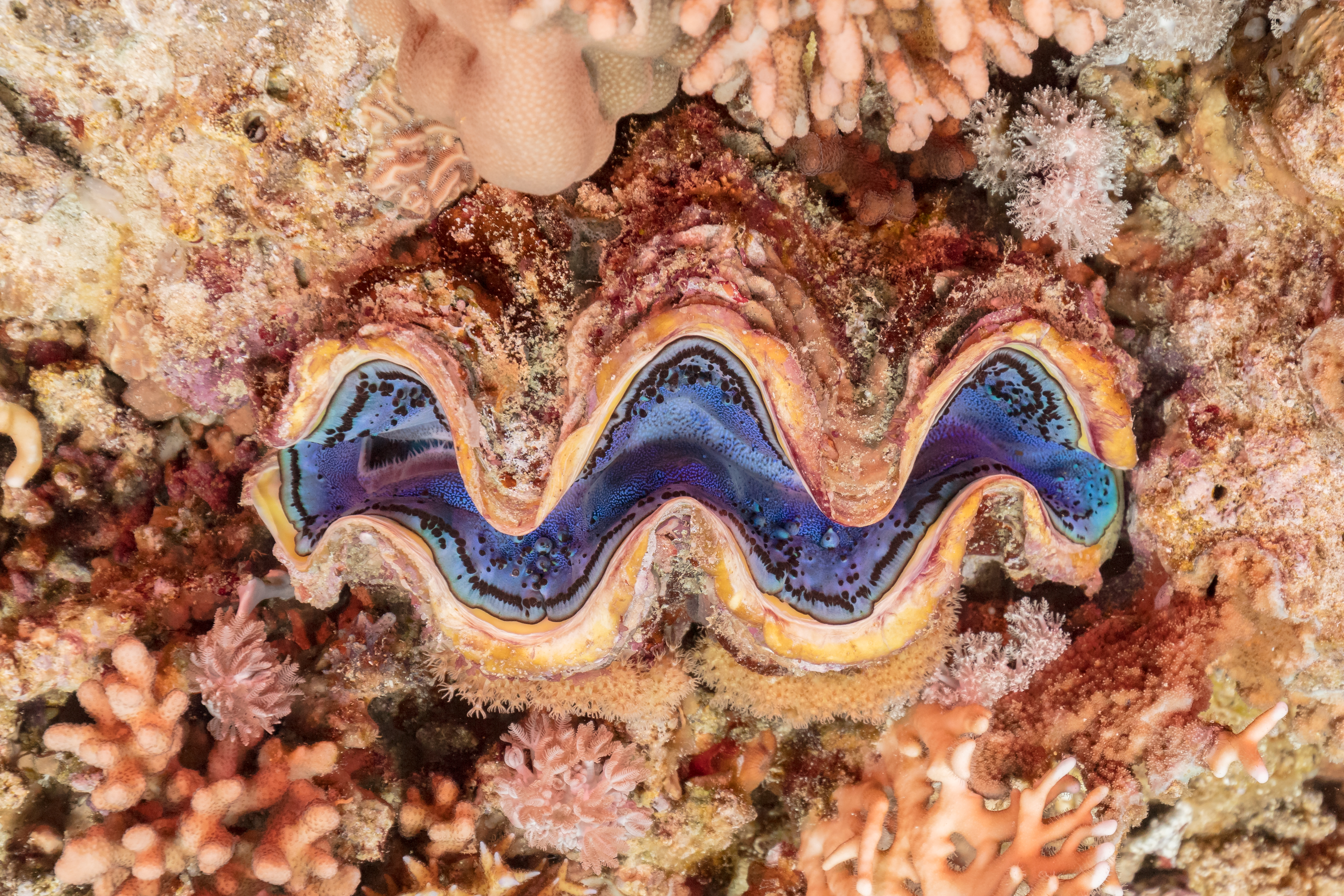

Conservation status
- Least Concern (IUCN 3.1)
- CITES Appendix II

Scientific classification
- Kingdom: Animalia
- Phylum: Mollusca
- Class: Bivalvia
- Order: Cardiida
- Family: Cardiidae
- Subfamily: Tridacninae
- Genus: Tridacna
- Species: T. maxima

Binomial name
- Tridacna maxima Röding, 1798

Synonyms
- Tridachnes maxima Röding, 1798 (original combination); Tridacna (Chametrachea) maxima (Röding, 1798) · alternate representation; Tridacna acuticostata G. B. Sowerby III, 1912; Tridacna compressa Reeve, 1862 junior subjective synonym; Tridacna detruncata Bianconi, 1869 junior subjective synonym; Tridacna elongata Lamarck, 1819 junior subjective synonym; Tridacna fossor Hedley, 1921; Tridacna imbricata (Röding, 1798); Tridacna lanceolata G. B. Sowerby II, 1884 junior subjective synonym; Tridacna maxima var. fossor Hedley, 1921 junior subjective synonym; Tridacna mutica Lamarck, 1819 (synonym - pars); Tridacna reevei Hidalgo, 1903 junior subjective synonym; Tridacna rudis Reeve, 1862 junior subjective synonym; Tridacna troughtoni Iredale, 1927 junior subjective synonym

= Maxima clam =

Species of bivalve

Tridacna maxima, also known as the maxima clam or the small giant clam, is a species of bivalve mollusc found throughout the Indo-Pacific region.

They are much sought after in the aquarium trade, as their often striking coloration mimics that of the true giant clam; however, the maximas maintain a manageable size, with the shells of large specimens typically not exceeding 20 centimetres (7.9 in) in length.

== Description ==
Bivalves have two valves on the mantle. These siphon water through the body to extract oxygen from the water using the gills and to feed on algae. The maxima is less than one-third the size of the true giant clam (Tridacna gigas).

=== Shell ===
Adults develop a large shell that adheres to the substrate by its byssus, a tuft of long, tough filaments that protrude from a hole next to the hinge.

=== Mantle ===
When open, the bright blue, green or brown mantle is exposed and obscures the edges of the shell which have prominent, distinctive furrows. The attractive colours of the small giant clam are the result of crystalline pigment cells. These are thought to protect the clam from the effects of intense sunlight, or bundle light to enhance the algae's photosynthesis. Maxima produce the color white in their mantle by clustering red, blue and green cells, while individual T. derasa cells are themselves multi-colored.

== Distribution and habitat ==
The small giant clam has the widest range of all giant clam species. It is found in the oceans surrounding East Africa, India, China, Australia, Southeast Asia, the Red Sea, and the islands of the Pacific.

Found living on the surface of reefs or sand, or partly embedded in coral, the small giant clam occupies well-lit areas, due to its symbiotic relationship with photosynthetic algae, which require sunlight for energy production.

== Biology ==
A sessile mollusc, the small giant clam attaches itself to rocks or dead coral and siphons water through its body, filtering it for phytoplankton, as well as extracting oxygen with its gills. However, it does not need to filter-feed as much as other clams since it obtains most of the nutrients it requires from tiny photosynthetic algae known as zooxanthellae.

Beginning life as a tiny fertilised egg, the small giant clam hatches within 12 hours, becoming a free-swimming larva. This larva then develops into another, more developed, larva which is capable of filter-feeding. At the third larval stage, a foot develops, allowing the larva to alternately swim and rest on the substrate. After eight to ten days, the larva metamorphoses into a juvenile clam, at which point it can acquire zooxanthellae and function symbiotically. The juvenile matures into a male clam after two or three years, becoming a hermaphrodite when larger (at around 15 centimetres in length). Reproduction is stimulated by the lunar cycle, the time of day, and the presence of other eggs and sperm in the water. Hermaphroditic clams release their sperm first followed later by their eggs, thereby avoiding self-fertilisation.

== Conservation ==
The species is protected under Appendix II of the Convention on International Trade in Endangered Species (CITES) meaning international import/export of all parts and derivatives requires CITES permits to be granted.

== Gallery ==
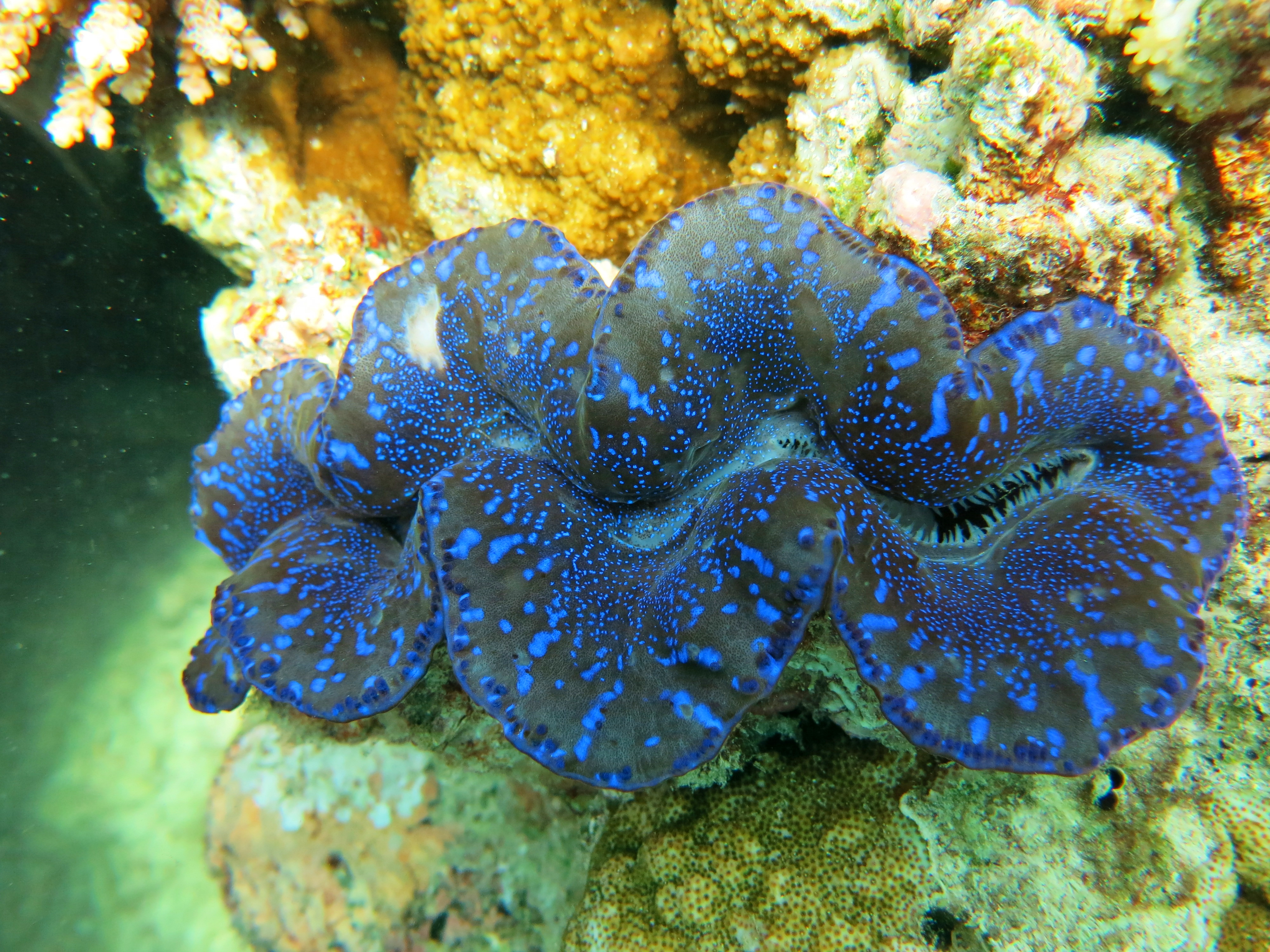

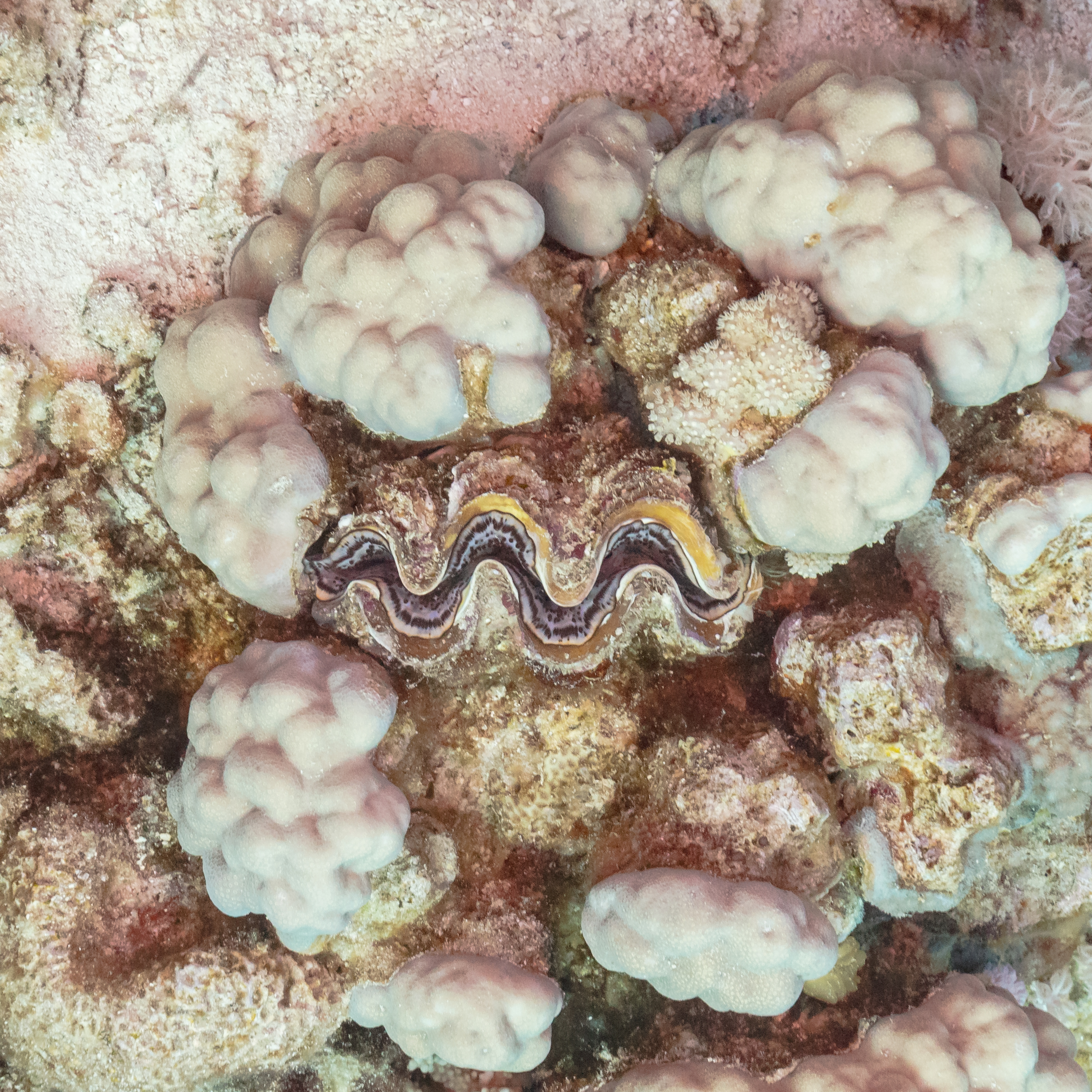

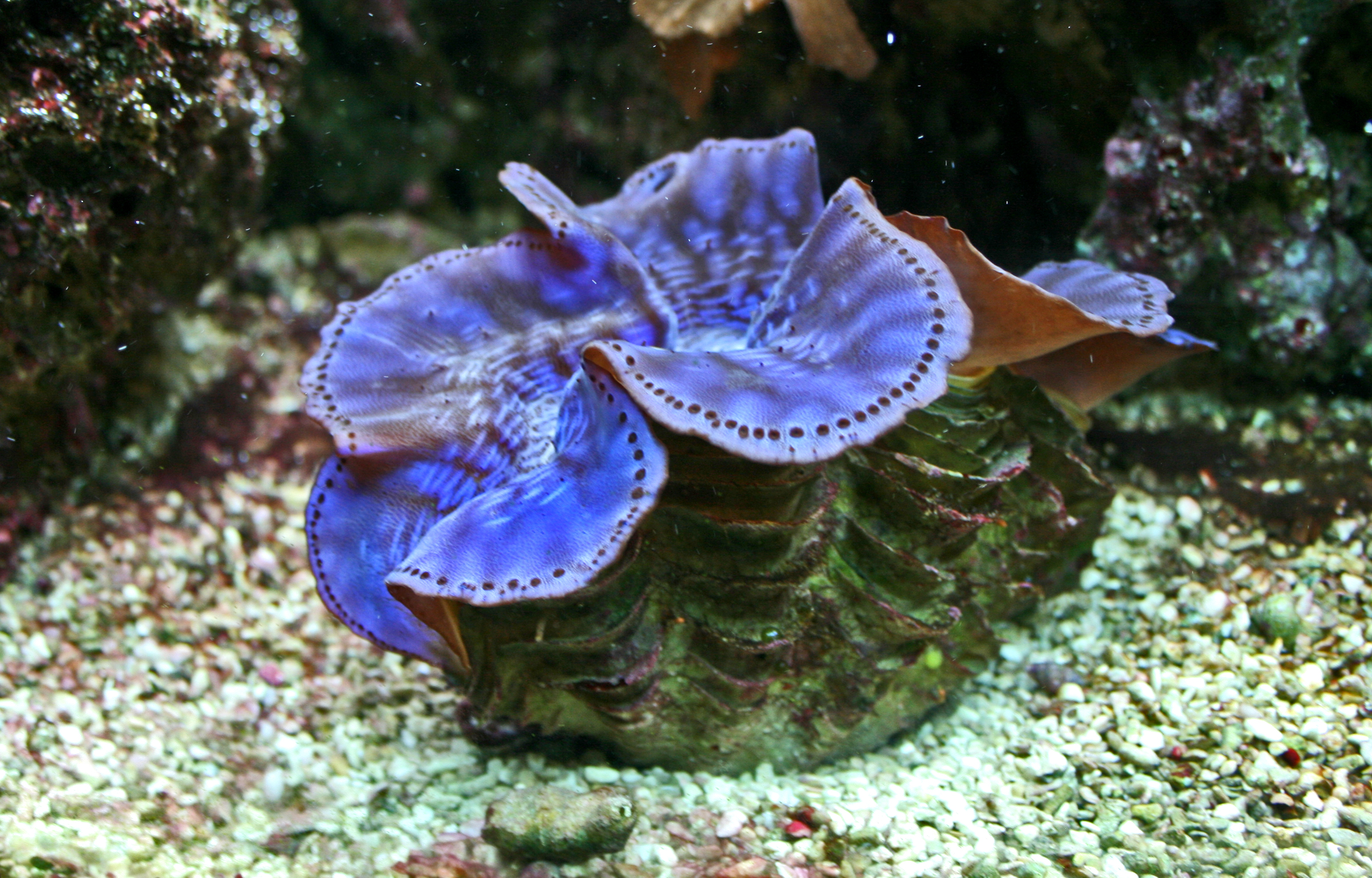

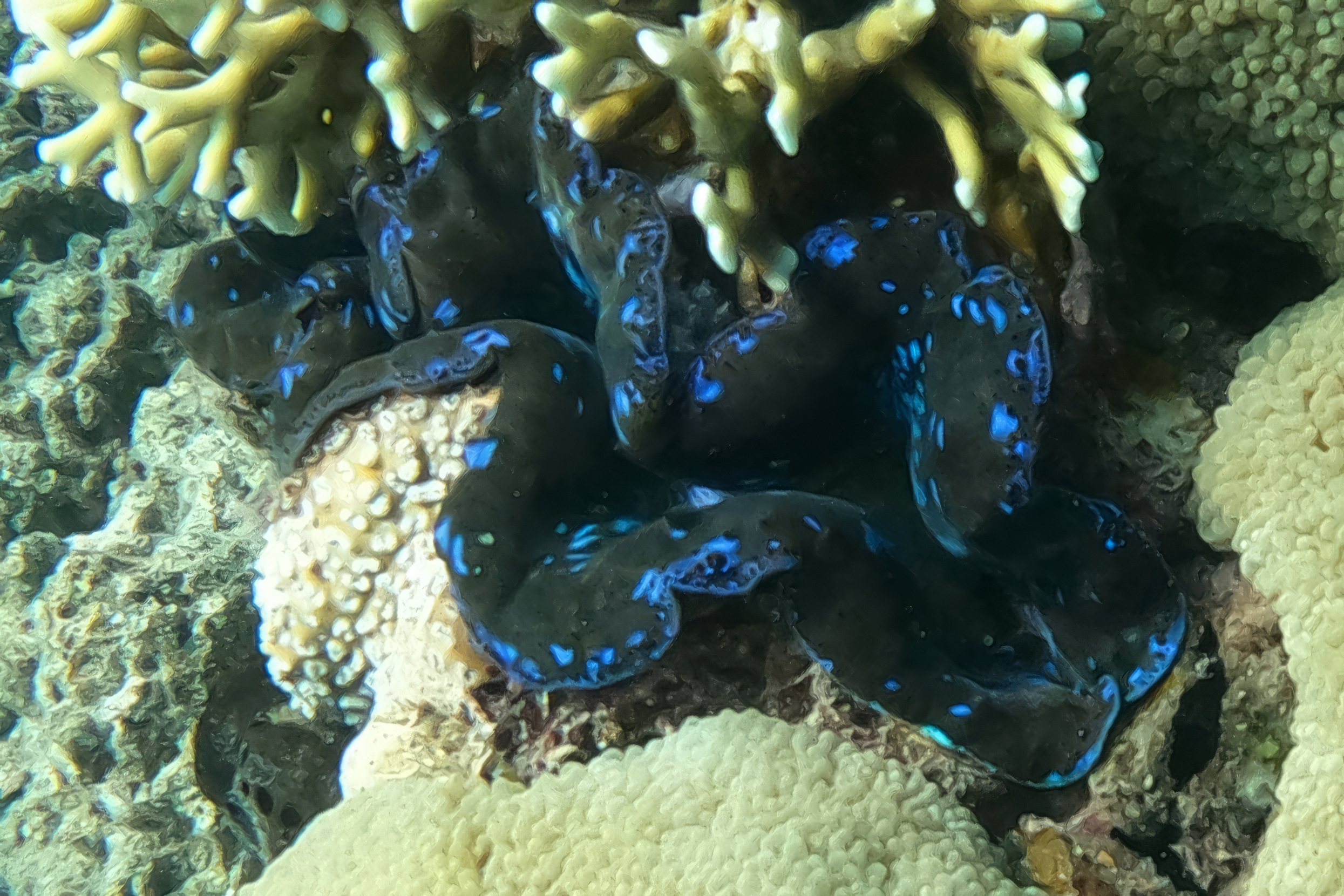
