= Municipal fisheries in the Philippines =

Fisheries within 15km of the shore

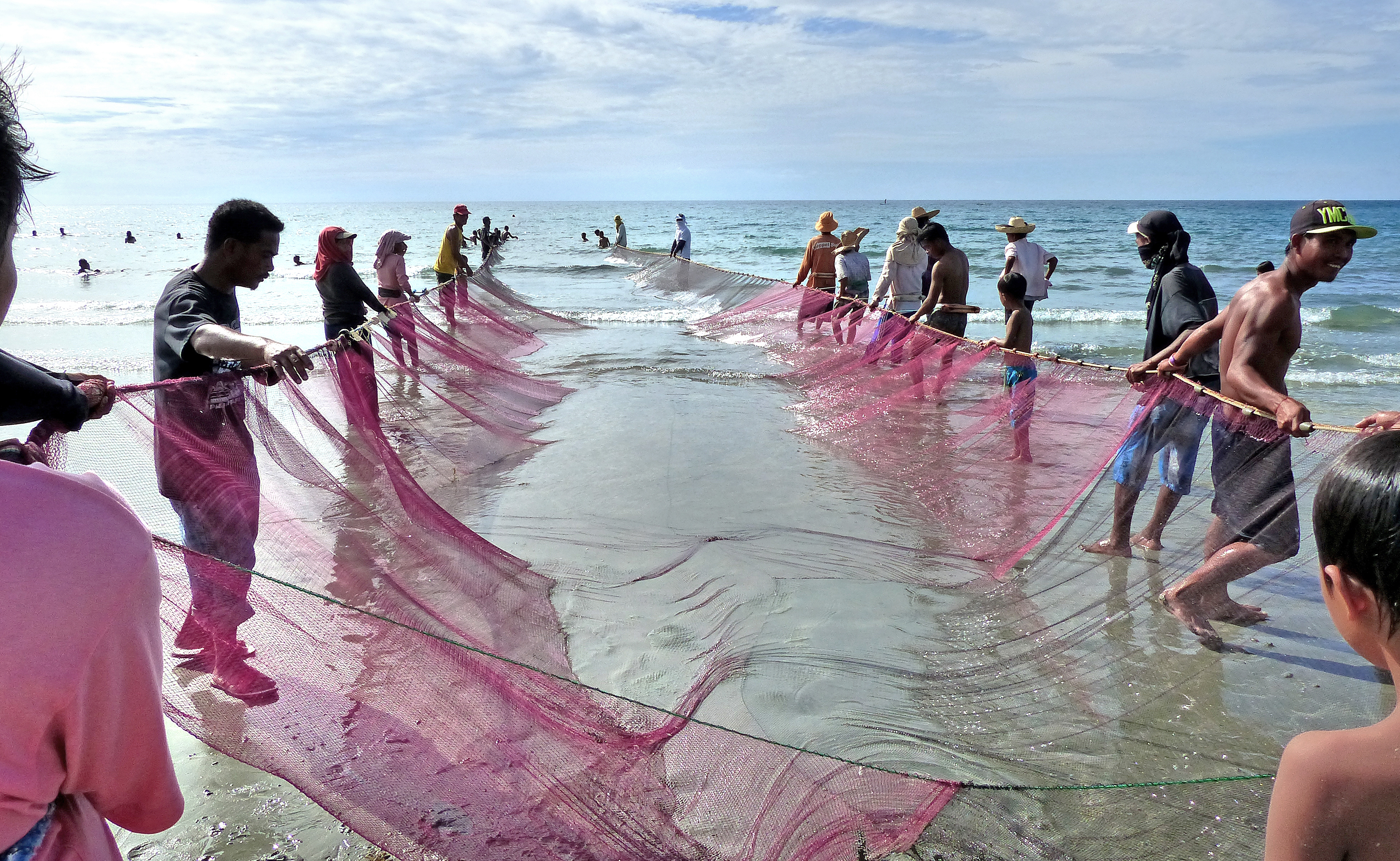
Fishing in Currimao

The municipal fisheries in the Philippines are the Philippine fisheries that fall under the jurisdiction of local governments, namely cities and municipalities. This includes all fisheries on inland waters, and in waters within 15 kilometres (9.3 mi) of the coast. While the term may technically include aquaculture activities, it is usually used to discuss capture fisheries. Municipal fisheries are restricted to boats of 3 gross tonnes or smaller, and commercial fishing vessels are generally prohibited from fishing in these waters.

A variety of commodities are caught within municipal waters, from high-value products such as tuna to smaller species caught for domestic consumption. Most municipal fisherfolk work on an individual basis, some with simple fishing methods. While municipal fisheries are crucial for domestic nutrition and livelihoods, most fisherfolk are poor. While municipal fisheries once made up the majority of fishery output, by 2020 they produced only about a fifth of national production.

Municipal fisheries have historically been heavily overfished, especially as fishing industrialized after World War II. Various efforts were made over time to ensure the sustainability of municipal fisheries, with current law under the Fisheries Code of 1998 banning commercial fishing from municipal waters and charging local governments with ensuring fisheries are sustainable. Local governments can implement more stringent regulations than the national baseline, as well as establish protected areas and closed seasons within their waters.

== Definition and subsectors ==
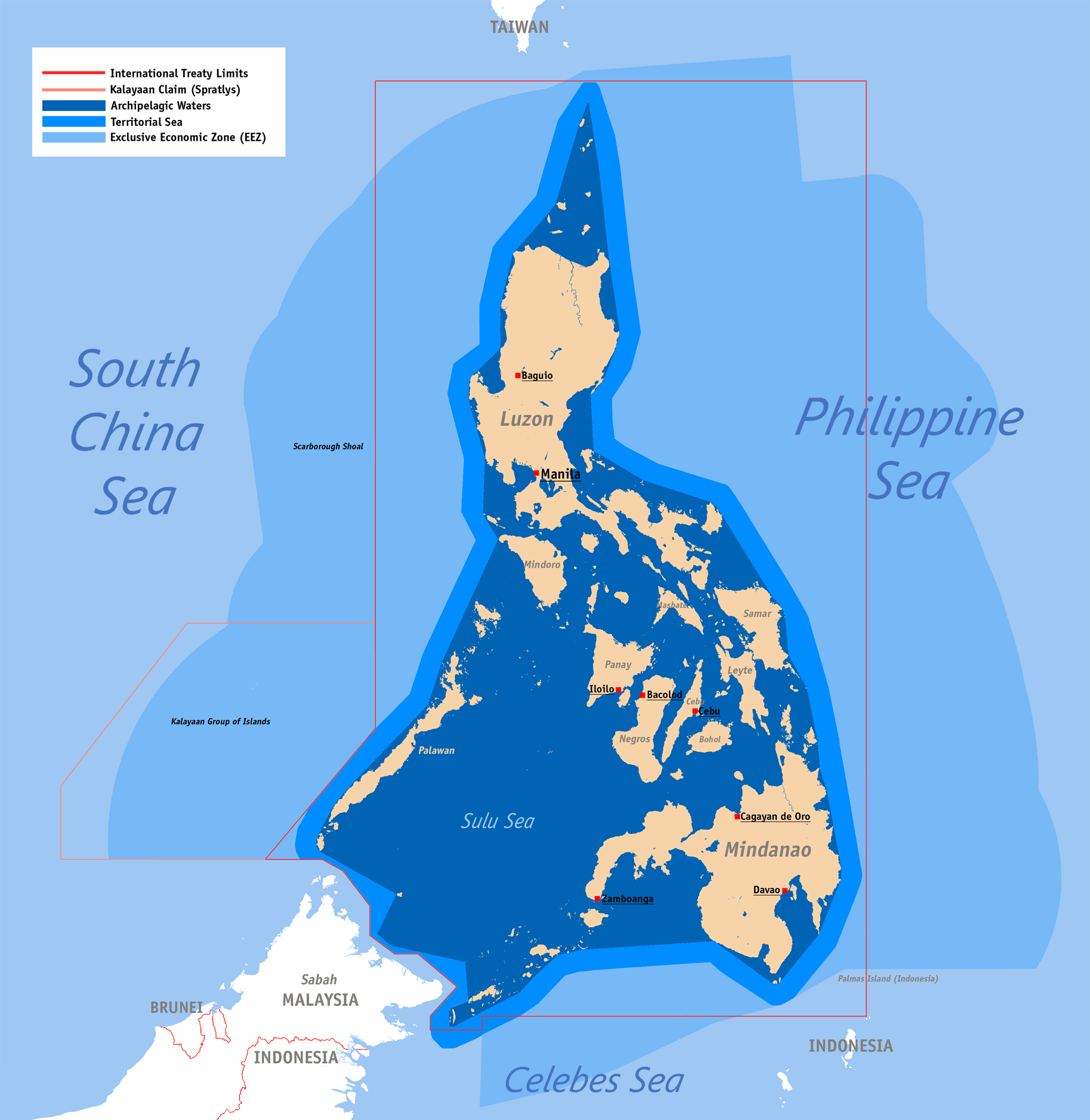
Territorial waters and exclusive economic zone of the Philippines

The Philippines is an archipelagic state whose over 7,000 islands of roughly 300,000 square kilometres (120,000 sq mi) are surrounded by 36,289 kilometres (22,549 mi) of coastline supporting a large coastal population. The fisheries in the Philippines that are either inland or within 15 kilometres (9.3 mi) of the shore are classified as municipal fisheries, falling under the jurisdiction of cities and municipalities. The marine subsector is much larger.

Inland waters include 246,063 hectares (608,030 acres) of swamplands (106,328 hectares (262,740 acres) freshwater, 137,735 hectares (340,350 acres) brackish), 200,000 hectares (490,000 acres) of lakes, 31,000 hectares (77,000 acres) of rivers, and 19,000 hectares (47,000 acres) of reservoirs. There are 23 lakes over 100 hectares (250 acres) in the country. 74% of all lake area comes from just three: the 90,000-hectare (220,000-acre) Laguna de Bay, the 34,304-hectare (84,770-acre) Lake Lanao, and the 24,400-hectare (60,000-acre) Taal Lake. Other notable lakes include Naujan Lake (7,576.32 hectares (18,721.5 acres)), Lake Buhi (1,630.30 hectares (4,028.6 acres)), Lake Bato (2,617.81 hectares (6,468.7 acres)), Lake Mainit (14,202.31 hectares (35,094.7 acres)), Lake Wood (687.37 hectares (1,698.5 acres)), Lake Dapao (974.14 hectares (2,407.2 acres)), and Lake Buluan (5,032.73 hectares (12,436.1 acres)).

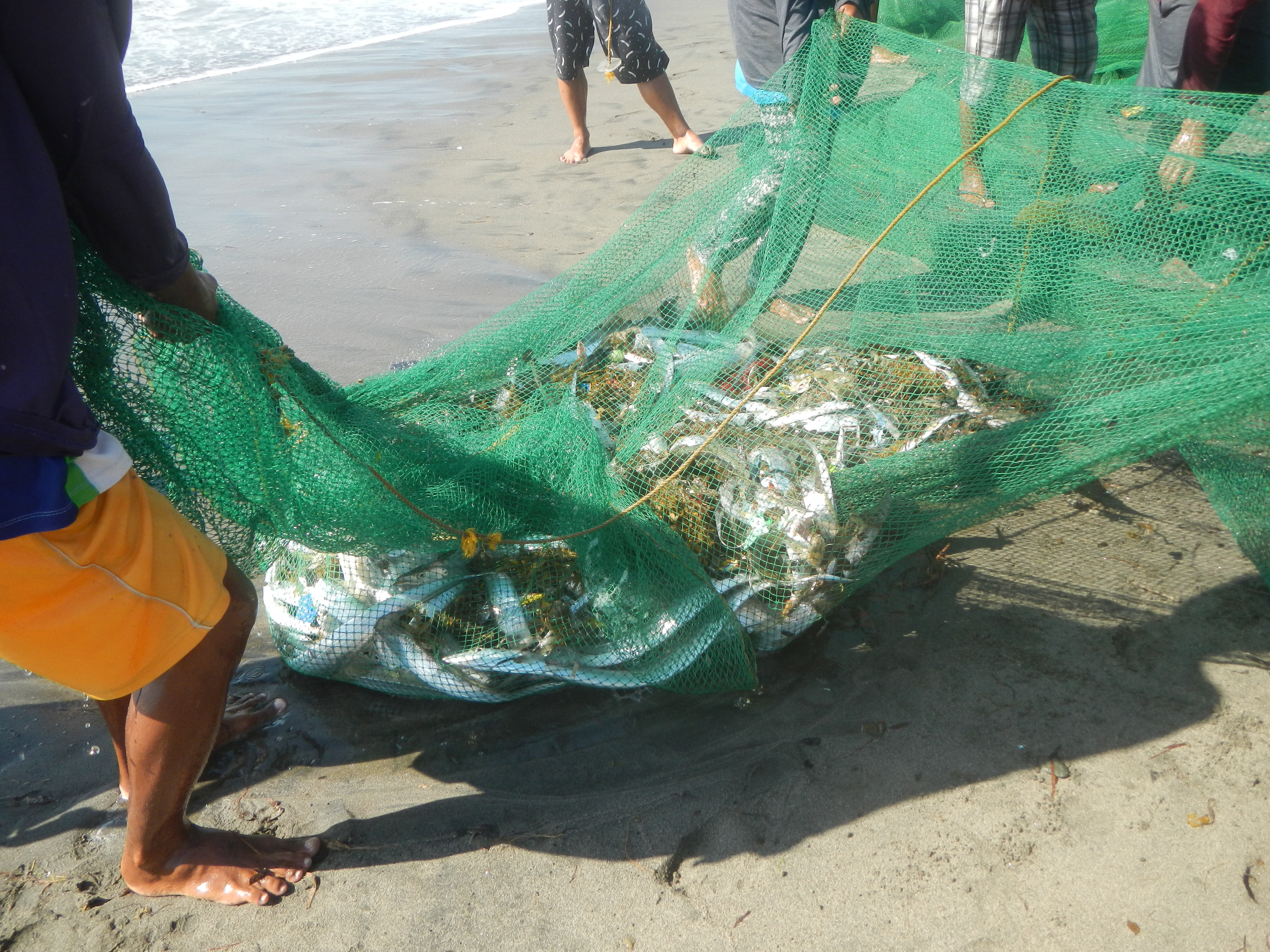
Fishing with a beach seine

Coastal waters include 184,600 square kilometres (71,300 sq mi) on continental shelf of 200 metres (660 ft) deep or less. Highly productive due to large amounts of sunlight, and stable and warm temperatures, the country's marine waters are highly diverse and are part of the Coral Triangle. The Verde Island Passage is possibly the most diverse marine area on the planet. There are 27,000 square kilometres (10,000 sq mi) of coral reefs in the country. Reef fish provide between 15% and 30% of municipal fisheries catch, with some islands relying on reefs for as much as 70% of their catch. There are 19 seagrass species, with seagrass meadows covering up to 24% of territorial waters. The value of marine ecosystem services is thought to be around US$966.6 billion.

Municipal fisheries are defined as "fishing in coastal and inland waters with or without the use of boats that are 3 gross tonnes or less". These boats can be motorized, or non-motorized using paddles or sails. Municipal fisherfolk as defined by the Philippine Fisheries Act of 1998 are those directly or indirectly involved in municipal fisheries. This has strong overlaps with the concepts of "artisanal fisheries" and "small-scale fisheries". Fisherfolk include those working in capture fishing, aquaculture, vending, gleaning, and processing, and other activities related to fisheries. About half of registered municipal fisherfolk are involved in capture fisheries. The Luzon and Visayas areas have significant numbers of small-scale fisheries. While aquaculture generally occurs in municipal waters, it is generally distinct from capture fisheries.

== Resources ==
Municipal fisheries commodities caught in 2022
Commodity	Volume (metric tons)	Value (PhP)
Tuna	140,103.26	18,898,439,330
Sardines	104,234.43	5,038,427,320
Bigeye scad	76,693.27	8,984,019,300
Tilapia	52,126.25	4,529,873,220
Mackerel	49,085.92	6,814,707,220
Squid	48,243.03	7,153,945,200
Roundscad	39,230.16	4,353,897,360
Anchovies	38,135.03	3,176,632,410
Threadfin bream	29,025.99	4,536,034,960
Crab	28,227.72	5,295,086,930
Other	521,407.16	58,877,481,490
TOTAL	1,126,260.26	127,633,024,410

Municipal fisherfolk are often generalists, fishing for demersal and pelagic species, with demersal fish likely underestimated in official statistics, and potentially making up between half and almost all catch depending on location. Demersal fish are often coral reef inhabitants, and not a target of commercial fisheries.

The most caught and most valuable product fished is tuna. Other important marine fisheries include those of bigeye scad, mackerel, and squid. Inland, the most produced and valuable commodity is tilapia, followed by mudfish. Snails are the third most caught by volume but have far less value than any of the other top 10 largest inland catches.

Small pelagic species are the most commonly caught for low-cost domestic consumption, while large pelagic species are often of higher value. Large pelagic species found in the country include three shallow water tuna species: the frigate tuna, bullet tuna, and eastern little tuna. The most fished small pelagic species is Bali sardinella, followed by roundscad, bigeye scad, squid, and anchovies. Commonly fished demersal species are threadfin bream, slipmouths, blue crab, groupers, rabbitfish, spadefish, and catfish.

The cheap but nutritious sardine fishery consists of nine species, although there are six main ones: Bali sardinella, Goldstripe sardinella, white sardinella, spotted sardinella, white sardine, and fimbriated sardines. The most fished small pelagic species is Bali sardinella, followed by roundscad, bigeye scad (and others of the Carangidae family), squid, and anchovies (of the Stolephorus genus). Other small pelagics include mackerels of the Rastrelliger genus, round herrings of the Clupeidae family, fusiliers of the Caesionidae family, flying fish, halfbeaks, Indian oil sardines, and Indian mackerel. Their presence is generally seasonal. From 1991 to 2001, 37% of small pelagic fish caught were from municipal fisheries.

The country has 51 swimming crab species, 7 of which are fished for market. The blue crab Portunus pelagicus makes up 90% of all catches, with the rest is mostly made up of Portunus sanguinolentus, Charybdis feriata, Charybdis natator, Scylla oceanica, (Note: Not always considered a separate species) Scylla serrata, and Podophthalmus vigil. Non-marketed species are often caught as by-catch, or in the case of Thalamita species, by hand.

There are significant fisheries for the Acetes shrimp, Penaeus monodon, Penaeus merguiensis, Penaeus semisulcatus, Metapenaeus ensis, and Trachypenaeus fulvus. The details of squid fisheries are not clear, although it is thought the most common of the seven commonly fished species is the bigfin reef squid. The other harvested squid species from the Loliginidae family are Uroteuthis bartschi, Uroteuthis duvaucelii, Swordtip squid, and Uroteuthis singhalensis. Also harvested are Sepia pharaonis and Sepia esculenta. Octopus species include Amphioctopus membranaceus.

Other harvested commodities include sea urchins such as Tripneustes gratilla, sea cucumbers such as Holothuria scabra, Trochidae and related species such as Rochia nilotica, windowpane oyster, abalone (Haliotis asinina), and seven species of giant clams: Tridacna gigas, Tridacna derasa, Tridacna squamosa, Tridacna maxima, Tridacna crocea, Hippopus hippopus, and Hippopus porcellanus. There is also a specific market for ornamental shells. Snails were at one point harvested in large quantities through dredging in Laguna de Bay to feed local duck farms. After years of decreasing collection, they formed 50% of the lake's output by weight in 1973, but only 3% of the output's value.

== Methods ==
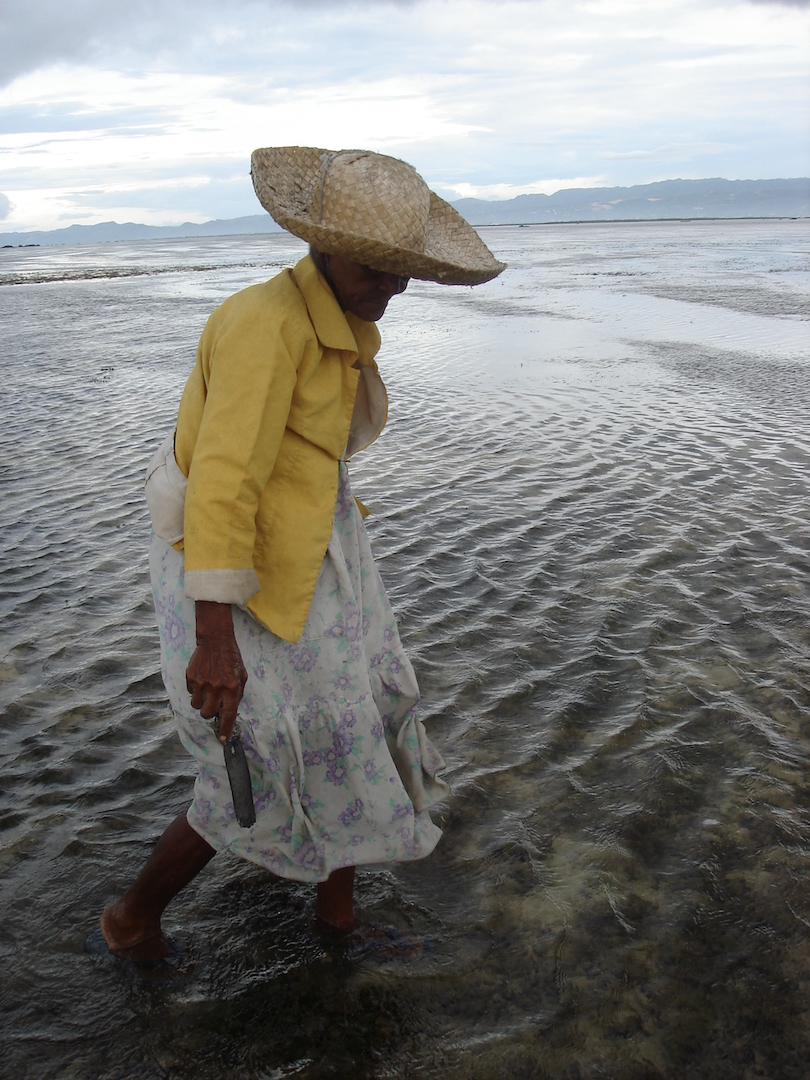
Hand collection of Sipuncula at Mactan

Most municipal fishing is done on an individual basis. Common fishing gear includes gillnets, handlines, fish traps, and ringnets. The cost involved in capture fisheries are mostly operational, with less than 10% being fixed costs like licenses, taxes, and fees. As of 2020, there were 267,807 municipal fishing vessels, most of which are bangka that are either motorized or sail/paddle powered. Some municipal fishing is also carried out from bamboo rafts called payao which function as fish aggregating devices.

Artificial reefs are also used to aggregate catch in municipal waters. Such devices are usually owned by a specific person or company, and can boost catch by around 35%. Large fishing light attractors known as "superlights" are used to attract species such as the squid Uroteuthis bartschi.

Most inland fishing boats, which ply brackish waters, estuaries, lakes, reservoirs, and rivers, are smaller than 3 gross tonnes. Common inland fishing gear includes cover pots, fish traps, pole-and-line, lift nets, push nets, skimming nets, cover nets, gillnets, dredging tools, beach seines, cast nets, and ringnets. In 2012, inland fisheries caught 62% fish, 33% mollusks (such as snails), and 5% crustaceans (such as shrimps and prawns). Some municipal fisherfolk continue to rely on traditional methods, including hook-and-line fishing, beach seines, small nets and traps, fish corrals, hand spears, and the manual collection of seaweed and invertebrates. Some fish caught in inland waters are likely escapees from aquaculture pens.

Otter and beam trawling now mostly target shrimp. Trawls small enough to be deployed by boats smaller than 3 GT are known as baby trawls. Those boats smaller than 2 GT are also sometimes called mini-trawlers. Municipal fishery catch is usually sold directly in smaller ports, sometimes to middlemen who transport them to nearby communities.

== Productivity ==
As of 2020, 22.34% of the country's total fisheries production was from municipal capture fisheries. This came from 952,188.62 tons of marine fisheries and 150,073.74 tons of inland fisheries. The municipal fisheries sector grew 2.65% from 2021 to 2022.

Inland capture fisheries are relatively minor nationally, but are important for their local communities. They saw the capture of an average of 0.26 million tons a year in the 1980s, which decreased to 0.19 million tons in the 1990s, and 0.15 million tons in the 2000s. The 0.16 million tons produced in 2018 was about 1% of the global inland catch.

=== By region ===
From 2013 to 2022, municipal capture fishery production has declined across 10 of the 17 regions, most significantly in the Central Visayas region where production decreased 42.61% (32,867.51 metric tons) over that time. Production in Bangsamoro, Metro Manila, and the Davao Region went against the overall trend, increasing during this time.

In 2022, the region with the highest productivity from municipal fisheries is Bangsamoro, which has the second largest marine municipal fisheries sector, producing 120,723.92 metric tons in 2022, and the largest inland municipal fisheries sector, producing 65,440.61 metric tons in 2022. The Zamboanga Peninsula has the second largest overall municipal fishery, almost completely from its 123,284.58 metric ton marine municipal fishery, although the municipal fisheries of the Western Visayas region were of the second greatest value. The inland Cordillera Administrative Region has a small inland municipal fisheries sector producing only 539.15 metric tons. The only other region with more productive inland fisheries than coastal fisheries is Calabarzon, with a 35,047.27 metric ton inland fishery and a 31,871.12 metric ton marine fishery in 2022.

Amount and value of municipal fisheries catch per region in 2022
Region	Marine fisheries (metric tons)	Inland fisheries (metric tons)	Marine fisheries (PhP)	Inland fisheries (PhP)
NCR	12,493.18	2,716.25	806,483,020	146,227,260
CAR	539.15		75,211,450	
I	23,770.63	2,807.07	3,387,896,840	303,949,350
II	17,932.40	8,522.37	2,272,175,050	871,916,380
III	34,695.21	21,483.42	4,670,860,740	2,067,105,160
IV-A	31,871.12	35,047.27	5,592,740,410	784,713,930
MIMAROPA	102,459.13	2,211.78	10,614,397,790	214,294,360
V	112,243.18	2,811.11	11,876,222,510	222,051,180
VI	108,436.01	3,712.32	14,907,295,260	405,672,270
VII	44,187.28	81.19	5,933,652,510	8,535,710
VIII	77,235.38	1,303.15	11,407,903,860	167,972,650
IX	123,284.58	1,195.41	12,178,811,040	167,328,010
X	39,758.77	1,948.17	5,151,007,090	245,590,670
XI	43,256.12	71.57	6,420,888,390	8,610,730
XII	26,987.59	20,828.52	3,639,284,520	1,562,476,220
XIII	31,574.19	4,632.21	4,749,218,390	378,830,770
BARMM	120,723.92	65,440.61	9,084,364,520	7,309,336,370

== Impacts ==
=== Socioeconomic ===
Registered fisherfolk by region before 2022
Region	Male	Female	Total
NCR	10,396	2,831	13,227
CAR	31,321	14,726	46,047
Region 1	88,174	29,920	118,094
Region 2	94,730	32,822	127,552
Region 3	104,515	35,367	139,882
Region 4A	119,426	45,259	164,685
Region 4B	120,930	65,475	186,405
Region 5	152,524	57,761	210,285
Region 6	131,457	76,445	207,902
Region 7	104,136	46,351	150,487
Region 8	131,883	35,576	167,459
Region 9	60,308	34,997	95,305
Region 10	56,475	33,936	90,411
Region 11	46,085	21,218	67,303
Region 12	58,590	23,856	82,446
Region 13	52,676	22,377	75,053
BARMM	160,268	87,627	247,895
Total	1,523,894	666,544	2,190,438

Municipal fisheries are crucial to food security in the Philippines and are an important livelihood for many in the country. Calculations of fisheries values often miss small-scale consumption. Around 80% of those employed in fishing are thought to be small-scale artisanal fisherfolk. Most small-scale fisherfolk have few if any savings, and most municipal fishing equipment is uninsured. Small-scale fisherfolk are thus very vulnerable to natural disasters such as typhoons. Fisherfolk remain a relatively poor community. This is partially due to declining catches, with average daily income decreasing from the equivalent of 20 kilograms (44 lb) of fish in the 1970s to 2 kilograms (4.4 lb) in 2000. As of 2009, 41.4% were considered to be in poverty. Artisanal fishing is the second lowest-paid occupation after farming. Municipal fisherfolk earn more on average that commercial fishing employees, although both are highly variable. For all, average income is below PhP 500 (around USD 10). In 2018, average fisherfolk income was PhP 188,488.60 (PhP 15,707.38 a month). This varied regionally, being highest in Metro Manila. Of fisherfolk, 26.2% were considered in poverty, as opposed to 12.1% of the national population. Fisherfolk poverty continuously decreased from 2006 to 2018. In 2021, fisherfolk income in Metro Manila averaged PhP 25,752.50, and was lowest in Bangsamoro where the average was PhP 12,894.17. The overall decrease in poverty during the 2010s reversed in 2021 when 30.6% were considered in poverty.

Municipal fisherfolk may fish as a part-time complement to other work, such as agricultural labor. This may be due to fishing being impractical during monsoon periods with rough seas, or when fishing is halted during a seasonal closure. Wealthier municipal fisherfolk may have other jobs, or rent use of their fishing boat to poorer fisherfolk. Nonetheless, many are attached to their jobs, which has cultural significance, and may not shift even with strong monetary incentives.

Fishing is usually partially for sustenance, with an estimated 10-15% of catch eaten at home. Fisherfolk may sell their best quality catch, keeping low-quality catch or none for family consumption. Fish is also bartered for other goods, rather than sold. As prices are often regulated by middlemen buying from multiple sources, an increase in local catch may not increase individual income, as the average price of each fish will decrease. The inability of many municipal fisherfolk to build capital thus entrenches poverty in these communities. Households headed by a fisher spent proportionally more on food, alcohol, and tobacco than the average household. They are also larger than average while being less educated and having less access to water, sanitation, and electricity. The depletion of fisheries in different parts of the country has exacerbated the precarious economic situation of many fisherfolk in some local areas. Municipal and commercial fisheries often compete for the same fish stocks. Fish stocks in some areas are perhaps less than a tenth of what they were in the 1950s, and overall landings have been decreasing since 2010. The impact of this decline has been particularly impactful on municipal fisherfolk. As fisheries have depleted, fisherfolk have had to travel further away from the shore, which means the cost of catching each fish is higher. Some fisherfolk may simply be unable to afford the equipment needed to fish further out to sea. Decreasing fish populations have occurred alongside increasing coastal human populations.

Small margins mean that fisherfolk are vulnerable to rising oil prices, as it is common for around 80% of income to be spent on fuel. There are limited government initiatives to subsidize fuel to up to PhP 3,000. Other fishing supplies take up a further proportion of income. The government has developed specific plans to try and address fisherfolk poverty, including programs aimed at providing alternative livelihoods and improving fisheries management. There are calls to set up a national registry of artisanal fisherfolk to assist in government aid efforts. Some fisherfolk are organized into cooperatives, with almost 4,000 such cooperatives being registered in 2022.

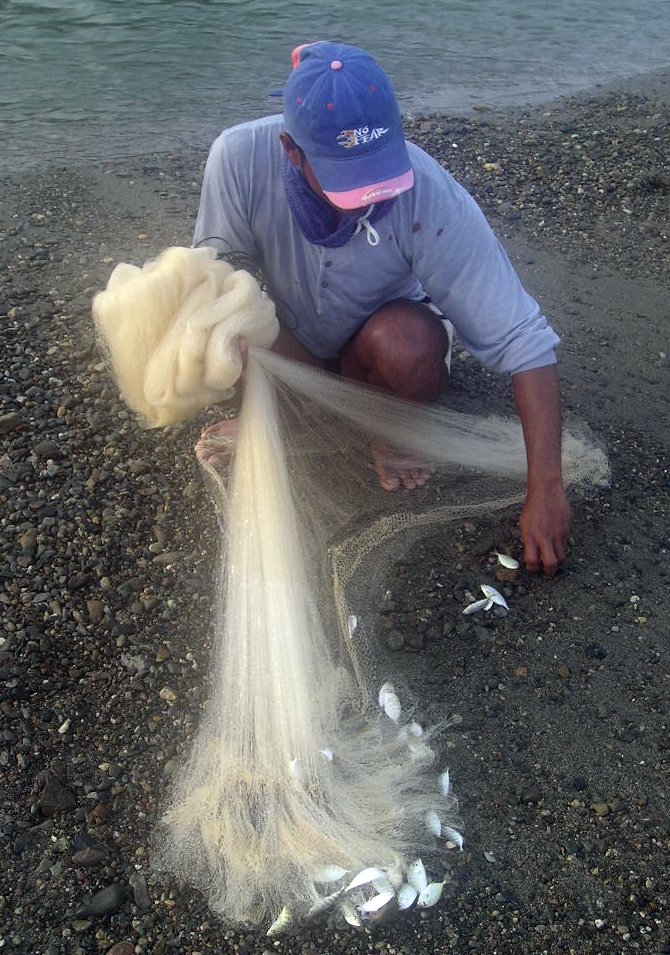
Small fish caught in Claveria, Cagayan

The development of more productive fisheries created social stratification, with commercial fishing boat owners of a higher class than their employed laborers and those in small-scale fisheries. While commercial fisherfolk are meant to fish only outside of municipal waters (15 kilometres (9.3 mi) from the shore), there are some conflicts between municipal and commercial fisherfolk. Key fishery species are caught by both municipal and commercial fisheries, with commercial fisheries taking 61.2% of the 10 most caught species in 2012 while municipal fisheries caught 38.8%. So long as it does not conflict with national regulations and the water is deeper than 7 fathoms, local governments may permit small commercial ships to fish 10 kilometres (6.2 mi) from the shore. The increase of commercial fishing over time and the concurrent collapse of municipal fishing have contributed to malnourishment. Where both fisheries compete for the same species, more are now caught by the commercial sector. Within a fishery, a small number of commercial vessels owned by a small number of households can capture a lopsided amount of the available catch than the larger number of small-scale fisherfolk in the same area, and make greater profit from each catch. Trawling is known to destroy passive fishing equipment, such as fish traps.

There is female participation in fishing and in fishing boat ownership, as well as in related roles such as gathering fry, preparing and repairing gear, processing catches, and marketing. Women often serve as middlemen, buying fish from ports and selling small amounts door-to-door. Where women are involved directly in fishing, it tends to be those inland or close to the coast. Women are often involved in fisheries management, being viewed as better at managing conflict. The low participation of women in those fishing from boats, perhaps 10%, results in women often being not included in statistics on fisherfolk. The catch of women is also more likely to be used directly for sustenance than that caught by men. Women may not be able to access markets of similar profitability to men and are underrepresented in leadership positions. The collection of shellfish from the intertidal zone is generally carried out by women.

=== Environmental ===
Human pressures occur alongside natural pressures such as those formed by the El Niño–Southern Oscillation. Catch rates in coral reef fisheries shrunk from over 10 kilograms (22 lb) a day in the 1950s to less than 5 kilograms (11 lb) in the 1990s. Both municipal and commercial fisheries are overfished, and mangrove areas are in decline. The causes for damage include dynamite fishing, cyanide fishing, bycatch, and fishing with small-gapped nets. Many sedentary and slow-moving, and thus easily harvested, invertebrate species have had local populations destroyed. The giant clam Hippopus porcellanus has been driven almost extinct, while Tridacna gigas and Tridacna derasa are overharvested. Some inland fisheries have been significantly overfished. The sinarapan, which may be the smallest commercially harvested fish, was driven almost extinct by overfishing in Lake Buhi. Gobiopterus lacustris has been almost wiped out of Laguna de Bay.

Bycatch in crab gillnets can reach up to 45% of the catch, and much is thrown out. Of the crabs caught, around 3 of every 10 caught are immature, and 1 or 2 are egg-bearing females. Gillnets in the Malampaya Sound have entangled dolphins, including the Irrawaddy dolphin. Up to a quarter of gillnets are lost each year, becoming ghost nets. Drift nets catch cetaceans and turtles, as do some other fishing methods, while dugong is known to become trapped in fish corrals. Some shrimp fishing is exempted from regulations prohibiting fine mesh nets. Perhaps 25-30% of intended catch is lost during processing, mostly within the commercial fishing sector due to a lack of cold storage.

== Management ==
Municipal marine capture fisheries by fish species in 2012
Species	Volume (metric tonnes)	% of total
Bigeye scad	72,058.85	6.6
Indian oil sardine	70,898.40	6.5
Round scad	66,328.55	6.1
Frigate tuna	59,118.78	5.4
Fimbriated sardines	47,088.01	4.3
Yellowfin tuna	45,757.33	4.2
Anchovies	44,014.82	4.1
Indian mackerel	42,530.25	3.9
Squid	41,388.69	3.8
Skipjack tuna	41,355.02	3.8
Slipmouth	39,286.37	3.6
Others	513,601.48	47.4
Total	1,083,426.55	100.0

Inland capture fisheries by fish species in 2012
Major Species	Volume (tonnes)	As % of total
Freshwater tilapia	47,439.27	38.8
Carp	26,807.82	21.9
Mudfish	10,703.17	8.7
Gourami	6,608.42	5.4
Freshwater catfish	5,768.40	4.7
Freshwater gobies	5,412.21	4.4
Milkfish	4,601.09	3.8
Silver perch	2,196.90	1.8
Manila sea catfish	1,874.69	1.5
Freshwater eels	1,149.18	0.9
Others	9,901.20	8.1
Total	122,236.59	100.0

=== National policies and legislation ===
Fishing is expressly meant to be managed through the precautionary principle to ensure ecosystem sustainability. Under the Constitution of the Philippines, marine resources are intended to be used exclusively by Filipinos. The Local Government Code of 1991 (RA 7160) defines the roles of local government units in the management of municipal waters. The Agriculture and Fisheries Modernization Act of 1997 (RA 8435) calls for the development of the fisheries sector to ensure food availability, create economies of scale, and create value-added products. In 1992, the National Integrated Protected Areas System Act (RA 7586) created a common framework for protected areas, including marine ones.

RA 8550 forms the basis of current fisheries law, replacing all prior laws that might contradict it. The primary goal of this act was food security, and its balance of ecosystem protection and fishing allowance was intended to achieve long-term sustainability. Within the framework of this national law, fisheries management in municipal waters continues to be devolved to municipal authorities acting under the Local Government Code. At municipal, provincial, and national levels, Fisheries and Aquatic Resources Management Councils (FARMCs) are established through Fisheries Administrative Order (FAO) No. 196 from 2000 and its later amendments. These provide an institutional framework for the cooperation of local and national governments with fisherfolk and other stakeholders. In some areas, like Apo Island, Cebu, and San Vicente, Palawan, this cooperation has led to sustainable coastal management. Representing the private sector is the government-funded National Agricultural and Fisheries Council. Handline fishing is regulated by Republic Act 9379 (the Handline Fishing law), which creates a specific designation for fishing vessels using handline techniques.

The Wildlife Conservation and Protection Act of 2001 (RA 9147) mandates habitat use is sustainable. Together with BFAR Fisheries Administrative Order 233-1 of 2010, it also promotes the protection of native species, including those important for fisheries. Other relevant acts include Memorandum Circular 2018–59 on Policies and Guidelines on the Regulation and Monitoring of Fishery Activities in Municipal Waters, Fisheries Administrative Order No. 155. Regulating the use of fine-meshed nets in fishing (amended by Fisheries Administrative Order No. 155-1), Fisheries Administrative Order No. 201. banning fishing with active gear in municipal waters, and Fisheries Administrative Order No. 223/BFAR Circular No. 253-1 which created a moratorium on licenses for new fishing gear for one year. The Department of Environment and Natural Resources (DENR) has responsibility for some aspects of coastal management, such as the use of mangrove forests and monitoring pollution. DENR also provides technical support to local governments for aspects of coastal management that fall under local government responsibility. BFAR also provides technical support to local governments. DENR has a general responsibility for environmental protection in both coastal and marine environments, sharing responsibility with local authorities where relevant. The protection of coral reefs and their associated ecosystem benefits, including supporting municipal fishing, is a critical aspect of Philippine food security.

=== Local government management ===
The Local Government Code charges cities and municipalities with managing all licensing and fees for municipal waters. Executive Order 305 charges them with registering fishing vessels smaller than 3 gross tons. Some licensing is done at the barangay level. Each local government can implement this in their own chosen manner, with there being no prescribed standard. Due to this, many local governments license based on demand, rather than through evidence-based management principles.

On the city and municipal level, the responsible bodies for legislation are the Sangguniang Bayan/Sangguniang Panlungsod. Local laws must be in line with national laws and policy. Local governments issue Municipal Fisheries Ordinances to cover their waters. (Provincial governments coordinate municipalities, but do not exercise direct authority over fisheries.) Municipal waters are delineated by the National Mapping and Resource Information Authority. Although local governments are responsible for registering municipal fisherfolk, BFAR has implemented programs to assist them with this. Municipal authorities may pass regulations with more protection than those mandated by national law, but cannot regulate for weaker protections.

Fisheries and Aquatic Resource Management Councils were established through Executive Order 240. These can be created at the barangay level, or the city/municipality level. Through these councils, fisherfolk and other stakeholders are involved in the development of local government management policies for marine resources and the issuance of fisheries licenses. As of 2022, 1,094 had been established.

Local governments are expected to maintain an annually updated registry of municipal fisherfolk in collaboration with relevant FARMCs. They are also responsible for registering fishing vessels. The issuance of fishing licenses is not comprehensive enough to effectively function as a management tool. While registration and licensing are theoretically separate processes, the registration process is effectively the licensing process for municipal fisherfolk. Registration processes differ per locality, although some governments sharing bodies of water cooperate on standard rules and regulations. Registration is only possible after living in the municipality for six months, and individual governments can add further requirements. Registration occurs at the barangay level, and lists of registered persons are available to the public. Not all municipal fisherfolk have boats, some use rafts or do not have a vessel. However, many may have unregistered vessels. Local governments responsible for registering municipal fishing vessels often do not seriously enforce compliance. An estimated 30-47% of municipal fishing boats were not registered in 2019. Boats larger than 3 GT must be registered with the Philippine Coast Guard.

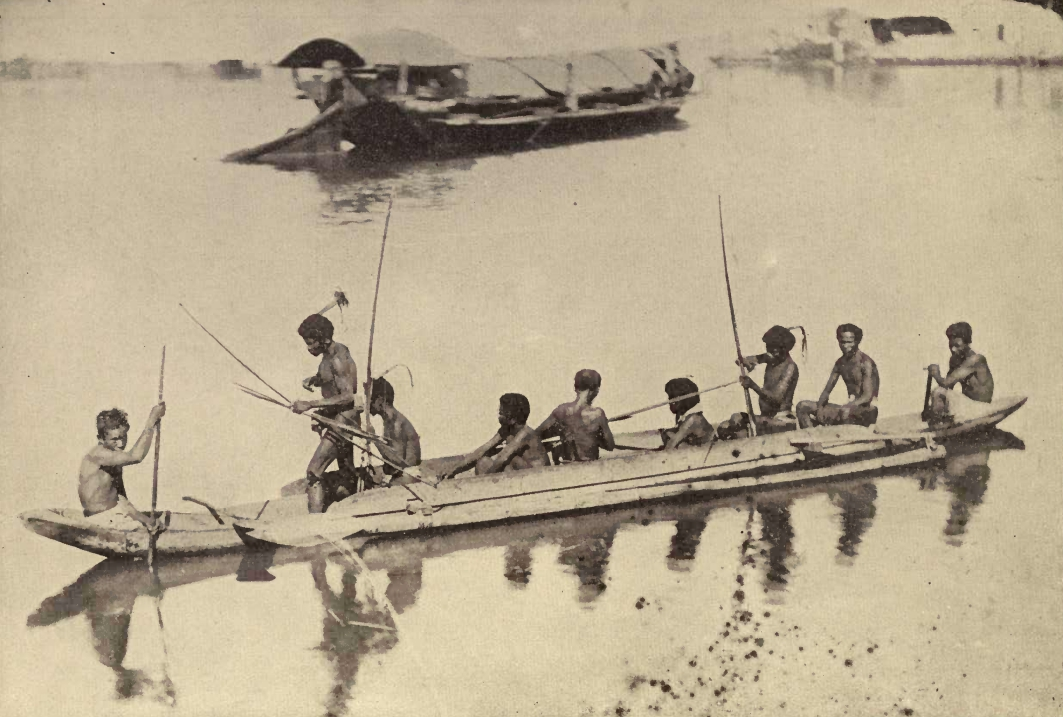
A negrito fishing boat in 1899

There are some special cases of fisheries management responsibility. Fisheries in Laguna de Bay are regulated by the Laguna Lake Development Authority. Municipal registration in Palawan is coordinated with the Palawan Council for Sustainable Development. Bangsamoro has its own fisheries powers. The Indigenous Peoples' Rights Act of 1997 provides some control over natural resources to recognized indigenous groups in their ancestral lands, meaning they can fish in recognized lands without registering so long as they follow fishing regulations, and other fisherfolk require special consent to fish in these areas. Ports can be managed by the Philippine Ports Authority or by the local government in which they are situated. The enforcement of laws is shared between many local and national bodies.

=== Techniques ===
Management tools included within the Fisheries Code of 1998 include harvest limits, vessel monitoring, compliance and penalty measures, fishing gear registration, and catch documentation. Other laws and ordinances delivered through means such as Fishery Administrative Orders, Presidential Decrees, and Letters of Instruction include those affecting technology (gear) legality and regulation, spatial restrictions, temporal restrictions, and commodity-specific regulations. Most management is area-based or temporal, limiting all operations within a certain space and/or timeframe, or regulated by species.

Restrictions on gear can include regulations on fishing net mesh size, fish hook size, fishing light attractor strength, and bans on fishing methods like trawling. Fishing with explosives, poison, muro-ami nets, and flammable substances to scare fish is banned nationally. There are minimum mesh sizes for different species, ranging from 1.9 cm (0.75 in) to 3.5 cm (1.4 in). In municipal waters, pa-aling nets, lights of too high a wattage, and active gear (gear used by moving such as trawls) are banned.

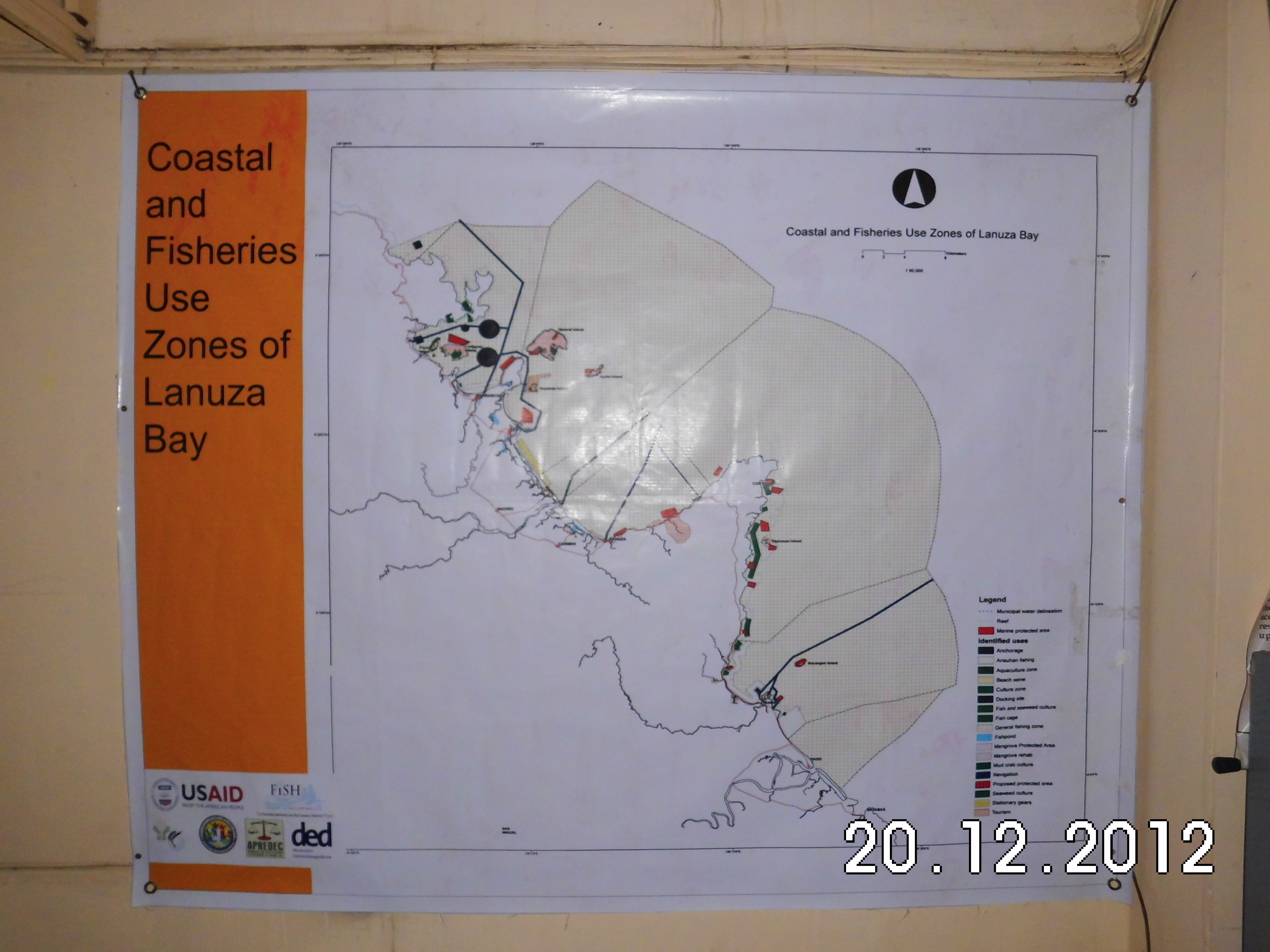
Coastal use zones of Lanuza Bay, showing marine protected areas, aquaculture spots, and general fishing zones

Simple to establish, marine protected areas have become a common tool to protect coral reefs. While some are national parks, many are created through local and community processes. The Fisheries Code of 1998 calls for 15% of municipal waters to be protected, in addition to protected mangrove areas. These should be established and managed by local governments in consultation with relevant FARMCs. National protected seascapes are established under the National Integrated Protected Areas System Act (RA 7586) and are managed by the DENR in collaboration with relevant local governments. Some local governments establish a number of separated small protected areas, for example one in each barangay. Marine protected areas are often no-take, banning all forms of fishing completely, yet they can often be acceptable to local communities who might participate in setting their size and boundaries. Their ability to generate positive spillover effects, increasing fish stocks in the surrounding water, is also recognized by some communities. Some protected areas can also provide alternative livelihoods through ecotourism. Many MPAs in the Philippines include both a core no-take area, and a surrounding area with regulated activities. Altogether, there are perhaps up to 1,800 marine protected areas of some kind in the country, where they are also known as Marine Sanctuaries, Marine Reserves, and Marine Parks. These have different levels of fishing restrictions and different levels of enforcement and effectiveness. In addition to fishery protection, they provide alternative livelihood opportunities relating to tourism, as well as generating community pride. The large number of MPAs mean some form networks of protected areas.

Closed seasons for specific species are enabled by the Philippine Fisheries Code. In 2015, a closed season was implemented to product roundscad around the Calamian Islands from November 1 to January 31 through joint DA-DILG Administrative Order 1. There is a similar policy in the Cagayan River to protect lobed river mullet, which was established through Fisheries Administrative Order 31 of 1952. From December 2011 to February 2012 the fishing of Sardinella was banned. Species-level restrictions may also be more nuanced, for example banning the capture of full-sized breeding milkfish. There are efforts in various places around the country to restore giant clam populations through artificial seeding. The establishment of marine protected areas and closed seasons helps conserve target populations but also interrupts livelihoods.

On the local level, closed seasons may be imposed on municipal waters by the local government in consultation with the local FARMC. Local governments are also able to use other tools, such as establishing MPAs, imposing fees, and regulating gear use. Local management often takes place through an integrated coastal management approach that accounts for different species and stakeholders. A ban on harvesting the sea urchin Tripneustes gratilla near Bolinao did not lead to a recovery of the species. Attempts have been made to supplement the wild populations with captively bred sea urchins. The rabbitfish Siganus fuscescens fishery in the same area has received a local closed season, which was similarly ineffective. Proposals for a no-take zone marine protected area were initially opposed by fisherfolk, although small areas have been established due to agreement on the usefulness of safe breeding areas. Opposition to the 1986 ban of muro-ami fishing led to the development of a modified method, pa-aling, which was restricted to certain areas and monitored. The use of kayakas, essentially smaller muro-ami, was also banned. A closed season effort in Palompon succeeded in reviving the local rabbitfish population.

Giving local governments responsibilities for fishery management has historically complicated the management of transboundary ecosystems. Since 2019 Philippine waters have been divided into 12 Fisheries Management Areas (FMAs). The FMAs were established through Fisheries Administrative Order No. 263, and allow for regional differentiation in fishing rules and regulations.

Blue crab production is highly variable, and some stocks have declined since the 1990s. A stock enhancement program began at Danajon Bank in 2017.

=== Enforcement ===
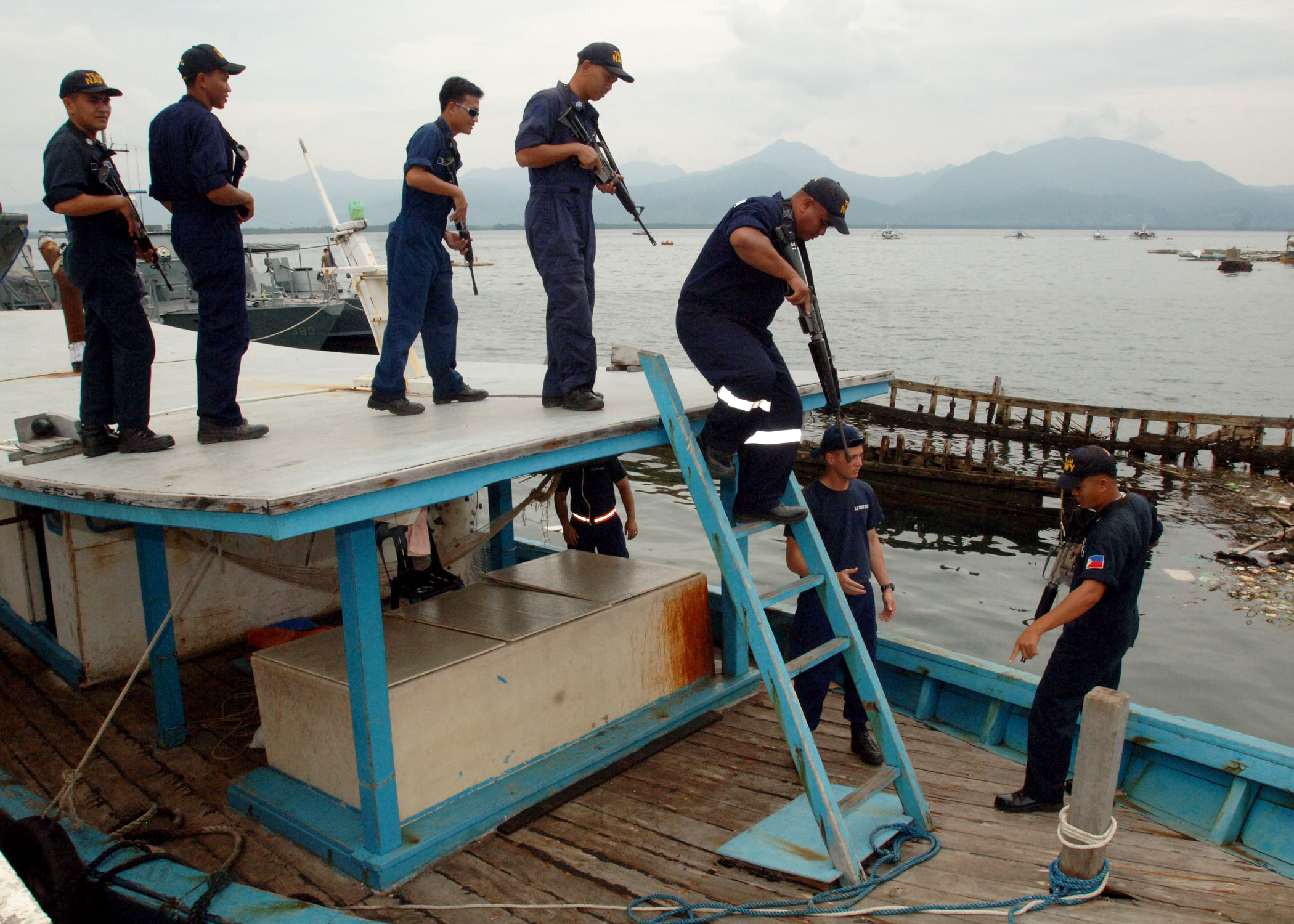
Philippine Navy sailors practicing boarding a fishing ship

Effective fisheries management remains a challenge due to the many interlocking factors affecting fisheries, and diverse bodies responsible for enforcement. The small scale of most fishery activities impedes monitoring and regulation. Boats registered as commercial vessels may not be large enough or properly equipped to fish those waters, leading to unprevented illegal fishing in municipal waters.

Philippine environmental law is often regarded as very high quality while facing a consistent challenge in implementation and enforcement. The prevention of illegal, unreported and unregulated fishing (IUU) is well established within fisheries legislation, being the key focus of the Philippine Fisheries Code of 1998 (fully named "An Act to Prevent, Deter and Eliminate Illegal, Unreported and Unregulated Fishing"). Perhaps 80,000-125,000 municipal fishing vessels are thought to be unregistered, and some vessels registered as municipal fishing vessels may be fishing commercially.

Management at the local level is often hampered by a lack of capacity, political will, enforcement, and transparency. Local governments receive some funds from the national government and have their own revenue-generating powers, which include revenues generated through their management of municipal waters. However, management of fisheries competes with other priorities and is often underfunded. National funding formulas take into account land area but not water area. Imposing fees on municipal water exploitation may produce political backlash. Compliance is often affected by community and fisherfolk acceptance, as well as by the design of the regulation and the attention paid to enforcement measures. Adhering to closed seasons is particularly challenging for subsistence fisherfolk with no alternative livelihood options. Similarly, dynamite fishing has been hard to prohibit due to the perception that it does not harm others, especially compared to the harm observed through legal fishing means such as trawling. Protections against marine wildlife such as dolphins are sometimes ignored as dolphins are seen as competitors. Enforcement for MPAs is patchy, with as few as 16% seeing strict enforcement, although designated areas are preserved better than other areas.

Commercial fisheries illegally operating in municipal waters have reduced catches in many coastal areas. The presence of bright lights at night time is often an indicator of illegal fishing in municipal waters. Commercial vessels are also known to fish around fish aggregating devices in municipal waters, drawn by high yields. This can be hard to police, especially when faced with a lack of political will or funding. Community-based law enforcement thus supplements government enforcement activities. This can fill gaps left when local governments are unable to carry out enforcement and national bodies cannot or will not assume responsibility, but actions such as citizen arrests do face the risk of countersuits. Under a program known as Bantay Dagat, local fishermen are encouraged to report illegal fishing activities. These organizations report directly to the mayor of the relevant local government. Bantay Dagat patrols provide monitoring services and meet with law enforcement to provide evidence, while also being able to conduct apprehension activities. They also run IEC activities in their local communities. As of January 17, 2002, there were 19,525 trained participants of Bantay Dagat throughout the country. There have been controversial political initiatives to modify Section 18 of the Fisheries Code and allow some commercial fisheries to operate in municipal waters.

=== Management plans and research ===
Data collection is particularly difficult for municipal fisheries, as municipal fishing boats are not well-monitored. Similarly, catch that is not landed in official ports and distributed locally is missed by official statistics. The real production from municipal fisheries may be 14% higher than the data shows.

A Comprehensive National Fisheries Industry Development Plan (CNFIDP) was put in place for 2006–2025. The 2016 to 2020 edition included a plan to develop more Community Fish Landing Centers. Community Fish Landing Centers are created through the cooperation of BFAR, the National Anti-Poverty Commission, PFDA, and local governments, with the aim of improving the livelihoods of local fisherfolk. They are used to distribute equipment, as well as provide training. The most recent CNFIDP revision was issued for 2021–2025. A National Wetlands Action Plan for the Philippines was put in place from 2011 to 2016. Plans to tackle IUU fishing include the 2013 National Plan of Action to Prevent, Deter, and Eliminate Illegal, Unreported, and Unregulated Fishing and BFAR's 2019-2023 Fisheries Law Enforcement Operations Action Plan (Fisheries Administrative Order 271 of 2018). BFAR runs an inland fisheries stock program, called the National Inland Fisheries Technology Center Program on the Fisheries Enhancement of Inland Waters, or Balik Sigla sa Ilog at Lawa (BASIL). This programs ensures inland fishery stocks remain stable by providing fingerlings for important species, most prominently tilapia.

Due to the decrease of sardine populations and their importance to coastal communities, a National Sardines Management Plan was signed by Agriculture Secretary William Dar in May 2020 following the recommendation of the National Fisheries and Aquatic Resources Management Council. Due to the establishment of the FMAs, the sardine plan is expected to be integrated into individual FMA plans that are then adopted by local governments. By September 2021, there were calls for FMA 7 to adopt the plan. By December 2021, FMA 7 was the only FMA that had done so.

The Philippine Council for Agriculture and Resources Research and Development (PCARRD) handled government research until 1987 when the Philippine Council for Aquatic and Marine Research and Development (PCAMRD) was created. The Philippine Fisheries Code of 1998 saw the creation of the National Fisheries Research and Development Institute under BFAR. The Philippine Council for Agriculture, Aquatic, and Natural Resources Research and Development provides some research funding and coordination on behalf of the Department of Science and Technology and the Bureau of Agricultural Research (under the Department of Agriculture. Research universities include the University of the Philippines Visayas, the Marine Science Institute of the University of the Philippines, Central Luzon State University, and Mindanao State University. BFAR runs a scholarship program to fund the takeup of a Bachelor of Fisheries. Research into sustainability has mostly focused on small-scale fisheries in Luzon and the Visayas, with comparatively less research having taken place for commercial fisheries and in Mindanao.

=== Threats ===
Philippine fisheries face a mixture of environmental, socioeconomic, and institutional challenges. Environmental damage to fisheries habitats has occurred alongside fishery depletion. Coral reef quality has degraded across the country, and by 2014 no coral reefs in the country had 75% or more of their area being covered by live coral. Half of all mangroves have been lost, in part due to direct conversion to aquaculture. This is despite the protection of mangrove forests bringing about positive economic outcomes for local fisheries. At least half of all seagrass beds have been degraded or lost. Invasive fish species have caused some damage to local ecosystems, however, the strictly economic value of these species has outweighed these losses.

Red tides and fish kill events are an issue, and fisheries face significant risk from natural disasters such as typhoons, landslides, volcanos, earthquakes, and tsunamis. Environmental damage from soil erosion, water pollution, and the degradation of habitats such as coasts, coral reefs, and mangroves threaten fish populations. Boat discharge and eutrophication have damaged coastal ecosystems, especially sensitive seagrass. Mariculture also introduces nutrient pollution into the water that can lead to fish kills. Water quality varies throughout the year. Pollution has also increased due to the overall increase in shipping.

Climate change is likely to damage the country's fisheries, slowing the growth of the industry compared to current conditions. Its effect is likely to differ between species, for example heavily impacting anchovies and tuna. It is also expected to decrease potential income among those who might purchase fish. Typhoons and other tropical storms cause direct damage to many fisherfolk, as well as to communal infrastructure such as ports, while reducing the number of fishing days. Rising temperatures will damage to coral reef ecosystems, and shift fish stocks away from tropical waters. Invasive species can threaten native fisheries. The presence of the invasive clown featherback in Laguna de Bay, possibly washed into the lake by Typhoon Ketsana in 2009, reduced the native populations of Leiopotherapon plumbeus, bighead carp, milkfish, and Nile tilapia, among other species. Clown featherback are worth less than these species, so as their presence in catch has increased to perhaps 40%, incomes have decreased.

Socioeconomic challenges have occurred as decreasing incomes and inequitable resource access have exacerbated poverty and created resource conflicts. Overfishing affects all commonly fished species. This means increasing effort is needed to catch the same amount of fish, although exceptions exist around historically less-fished waters around parts of Palawan, Mindanao, and the East Coastcoast. Fishing efforts exceed maximum sustainable yields.Fishing vessels have had to move further out to sea as nearshore fisheries became depleted. Overexploitation of demersal fisheries through trawling since at least the 1960s, with some stocks now almost wiped out. In addition to an overall loss of up to 90% of overall biomass, demersal ecosystems have also seen their species composition altered. In total, perhaps 75% of all fisheries are depleted. Trawl catch per hour has declined over time. Around 70% of fisheries are considered overfished.

Over time, the percentage of fish caught that are larger species has decreased. Squid have also been widely caught in juvenile stages. The introduction of payao, while increasing tuna fisheries, increased the catch of juvenile tuna, with some locations seeing 90% of catch being under a year old. In some areas, juveniles are deliberately caught, a process which not only weakens populations but can cause considerable by-catch.

Destructive fishing practices and illegal fishing practices include compressor fishing, spearfishing, and blast fishing. These direct impacts occur alongside habitat degradation of coral reefs, seagrasses, and mangrove forests. One study in 2000 found that blast fishing earned US$170 million, but caused US$1,640 million in environmental damage. In some places, increasing environmental awareness and the depletion of fish stocks have resulted in a decrease in blast fishing. Cyanide fishing was thought to be used by perhaps 4,000 individuals as of 2013. A USAID study estimated that local governments lost 3,000-9,500 metric tons of fish to IUU activities each year.

The live fish trade for food sees the use of cyanide fishing to capture fish. It has also had a direct impact on leopard coral grouper populations. This species is slow-growing, and its exploitation has been linked to localized decreases in average body size. The ornamental fish trade also uses cyanide fishing to capture live fish. The value of the trade was PhP 300 million in 2001. It is relatively understudied but is thought to have a highly localized impact on target species, such as the whitetail dascyllus, especially as the mortality rate of caught fishes may reach 80%.

== History ==
=== Early history ===
What is now the Philippines has a long history of coastal fishing communities, with folklore referencing relationships with fish and fishing. Control of coastal resources was likely exercised by barangay chiefs. During Spanish rule the Spanish Law of Waters was passed in 1866 which gave control of all coastal resources to the Manila authorities, from whom they could be leased for use. However, for most resources, there was no management, and so exploitation was effectively unrestricted. Chinese immigration during this period introduced new fishing equipment such as Salambáw nets that allowed for larger catches to supply growing urban populations. At the end of the 19th century, sapyaw/sapiao nets began to spread, and other new net types followed.

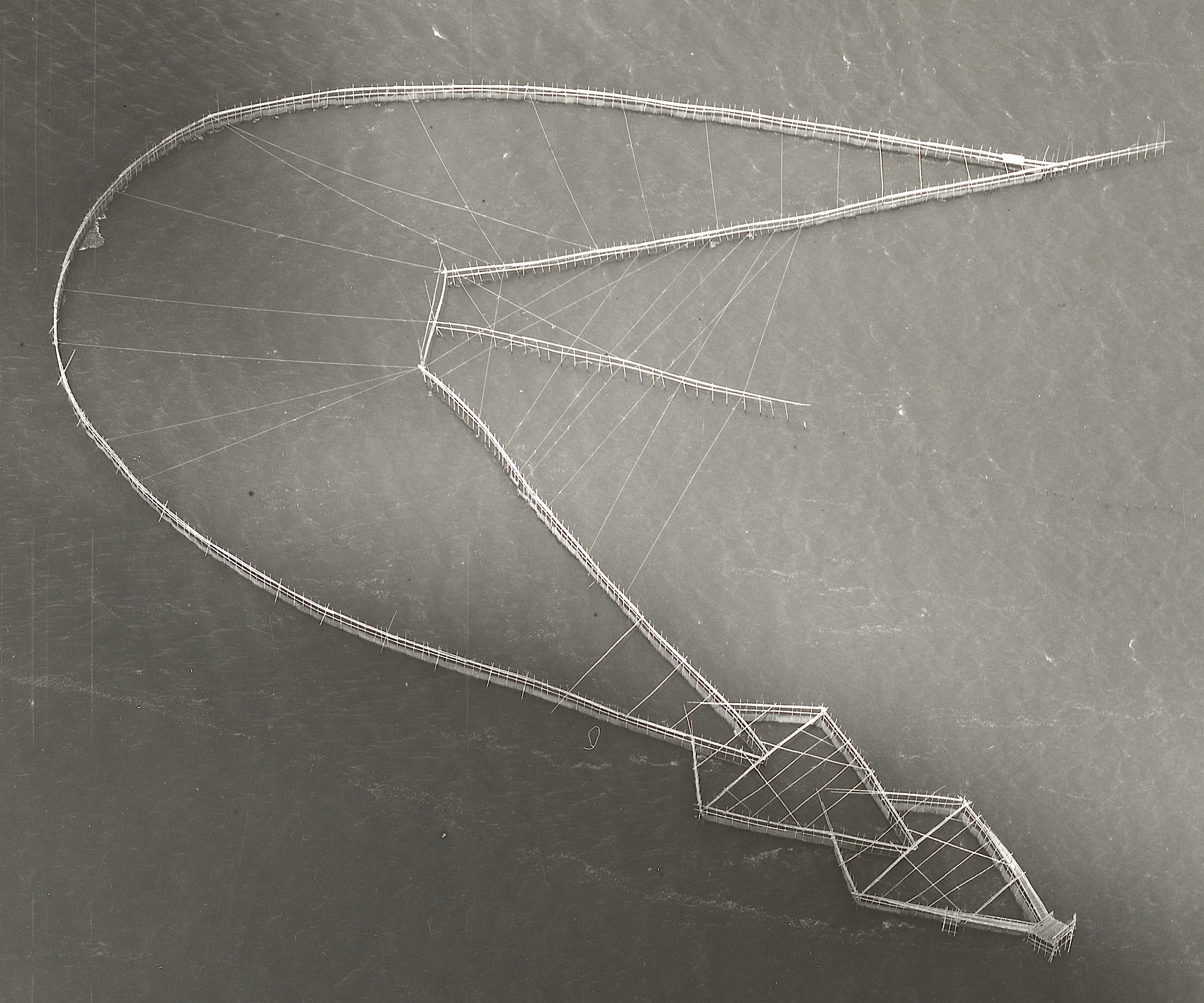
A fish trap in Manila Bay in 1933

A growing population during American rule saw demand for fish increase. Beam trawling was introduced by Japanese fishermen in the early 20th century, as well as muro-ami nets. This increase in productivity and increased demand led to the development of larger towns whose economy was based upon fishing. Dynamite fishing is recorded in the Lingayen Gulf as far back as World War I.

The Fisheries Act of 1932 (Act 4003) restricted fishing access to American and Filipino companies and created the concept of municipal waters, which reached 5.5 kilometres (3.4 mi) from the shore, within which only municipal governments could create fish ponds and corrals, catch milkfish fry, and license ships smaller than 3 tons. The law was the introduction of registration and licensing. Later laws shifted control over fish ponds and corrals back to the national government. The first closed season was established in 1939, covering parts of the Visayan Sea.

In the early 20th century the Eurasian carp was introduced into natural lakes in Mindanao. The fishing of milkfish in the sea was banned on August 5, 1949, through Fisheries Administrative Order 25 in order to ensure fry would be available to stock inland lakes and aquaculture. By the 1940s there were already at least 55 different types of fishing gear in use, broadly divided into hand instruments, barriers and traps, lines, and nets.

=== Technological development and commercial expansion ===
After World War II, municipal fisheries were 150% larger than commercial ones. The rapid development and adoption of new technology greatly increased fishery intensity. Active gear, such as trawl nets, began to supplant passive gear, such as fish corals, although passive gear remained common in small-scale fisheries. Trawl nets increased in efficiency. Motorboats began to spread, increasing range and mobility. In capture fisheries, otter trawlers began to be widely adopted, and in the 1960s purse seines became more common.

By the mid-1960s, production was double what it was in 1951. Overall, fishing efforts had an almost sixfold increase from this period to the mid-1980s. Some fisheries in Manila Bay were likely already close to being overfished during the 1950s. The technological development of the industry benefited existing capital holders, and commercial production soon began to outstrip the previously dominant municipal fisheries. The government encouraged this increasing output, without regard to environmental sustainability.

Demersal fisheries peaked in the late 1960s in most areas, although some fisheries continued to grow around Palawan, the southern Sulu Sea, and a small part of the East coast. A number of provinces banned trawling at various points starting from 1954, until May 1983 when Letter of Instruction 1328 banned trawling within 7 kilometres (4.3 mi) of the shore or in water shallower than 7 fathoms nationwide. The 1970s saw crab fisheries expand beyond artisanal tools, leading to a rapid reduction in crab populations due to trawling. Demersal catches did not increase after 1976.

Distribution technology, by roads and by sea, also improved during this time, providing larger markets for catches. Capture fisheries grew steadily until the mid-1970s, and starting growing again in the mid-1980s until the 1990s. While municipal catches decreased during parts of this period, increasing commercial catches compensated for this. Presidential Decree 704 (the Fisheries Decree of 1975) was the most significant fishery law since 1932, becoming the new basis for Philippine fisheries law upon its issuance on May 16, 1975. This decree maintained the established definition of municipal waters as being 3 nautical miles (5.6 km; 3.5 mi) from the shore, although this did not at the time exclude commercial fishing from these waters. While municipal authorities were nominally accorded some powers, all municipal ordinances and licensing required approval by the national government. Similarly, aquaculture in municipal waters remained under the jurisdiction of BFAR (except in Laguna de Bay, where it remained the responsibility of the LLDA). This decree promoted the exploitation of fisheries, although environmental problems had begun to become apparent, and the government began to tentatively look into coastal management near the end of that decade. An Integrated Fisheries Development Plan (IFDP) was developed in 1976, aiming to both increase fish supply and improve distribution.

During the 1970s, incomes among fisherfolk declined, and there was not enough data to set up effective management strategies. The average income reduced to halfway below the poverty threshold. Commercial operations outcompeted small-scale fisherfolk exploiting the same fisheries, further diminishing the already shrinking fish stocks available. While the number of ships in the commercial fleet was roughly stable, the average size of these ships increased. Municipal fishery production dropped to just 30% of the total. The capture of small pelagic fish plateaued after 1975, despite still-increasing fishing efforts. Capture effort for each municipal pelagic fish had already peaked in the 1950s. All fishing in the Lingayen Gulf peaked per unit effort in the late 1970s, after which it declined. In the late 1970s, the Biyayang Dagat program was introduced to provide loans to small-scale fisherfolk, however, they were often unable to provide sufficient collateral, and the program was later discontinued. The 1970s also saw the first coastal resource management programs aimed at creating sustainability in fisheries. By 1980, a number of municipal fishing areas from throughout the country had been identified by BFAR as depleted. Municipal fisheries off Leyte, Samar, and Sorsogon, as well as within the Malampaya Sound, had been closed to commercial fishing.

Studies in Laguna de Bay from 1961 showed its productivity was decreasing. Towards the end of the decade, while overall value increased, this was due to an increase in fish pens. Capture fisheries decreased in productivity, with a small increase in shrimp capture being overshadowed with significant decreases in fish and snail capture. A 5,000 hectares (12,000 acres) protected area was established southeast of Talim Island to protect the fishery. Separate national data on inland fisheries was first published in 1976. The 1980s saw a shift in management responsibilities from the national governments towards local governments. The Sumilon Marine Reserve was set up in 1974, and Presidential Proclamation 1801 established the broader concept of marine reserves in 1978. Puerto Galera became a UNESCO Biosphere Reserve in 1977, the Apo Island Marine Reserve was set up in 1985, and Tubbataha Reef became a protected area in 1988 before becoming part of a Biosphere Reserve in 1990 and a World Heritage Site in 1993.

Trawling decreased starting in the 1980s due to the overfishing of demersal fisheries combined with increasing cost, becoming replaced by the cheaper Danish seine. The destructive muro-ami fishing technique was banned in 1986, but was soon replaced by the similar pa-aling method. Artificial reefs, already used as fish aggregating devices since the 1950s, began to be officially encouraged as conservation and anti-trawling devices in the 1980s. Their impact was often mixed, and sometimes damaging. Captive giant clam breeding began in 1985, and research into breeding other vulnerable sessile invertebrates followed. Ornamental shell exports peaked in 1988, before declining significantly.

=== Devolution and the Fisheries Code of 1998 ===
The newly created 1987 constitution included a specific reference to the "preferential use" of fishing resources by "subsistence fishermen". In 1991, local governments became empowered in areas including fishing through Republic Act 7160 (the Local Government Code of 1991), now explicitly able to regulate without national government approval. This enabled more specific management of these coastal areas, and coastal resource management with the aim of sustainability became more common. It also expanded municipal waters from 7 kilometres (4.3 mi) to 15 kilometres (9.3 mi), shifting commercial fishing further from the shore, although in a way that created legal uncertainty around commercial fishing licensing and activities. In 1992, the National Integrated Protected Areas System Act (RA 7586) created a common framework for protected areas, including marine ones. This came during a period of political conflict due to increasing disputes over fisheries resources and the spread of the understanding of sustainability. The civilian coast guard was formed in 1997, and local governments gained some control over local police in 1998.

The 1990s saw a sharp increase in crab fishing, to fill demand created by the collapse of the Chesapeake Bay crab fishery. Overall marine landings were relatively flat from 1991 to 1995. Despite absolute growth, production per capita when compared to the national population decreased. Continued population growth led to increasing demand for seafood. Combined with decreasing fish catch, average consumption of seafood fell during the 1990s. Per capita consumption declined from around 40 kilograms (88 lb) in 1987 to 24 kilograms (53 lb) in 1996. In 1998, fisheries produced 2.7% of GDP (17.6% of agricultural activities), while providing 3% of employment, of which 68% was from manpower-intensive municipal fisheries.

In 1998, fisheries laws were entirely overhauled through Republic Act 8550 (the Fisheries Code of 1998), which replaced all former laws and became the basis of further legislation going forward. The Fisheries Code of 1998 assigned management of these municipal waters fully to local governments, with the intention that their exploitation be mostly restricted to the residents of their municipality. Following the fisheries code, trawling was treated as banned throughout all municipal waters. The code also reinforced the concept of integrated coastal management, the importance of local management, and the inclusion of community stakeholders in fisheries management. The legal debate around commercial fishing was clarified, assigning jurisdiction to local governments who could allow boats up to 50 GT to fish from 10.1 kilometres (6.3 mi) off their shores. Also under the Fisheries Code of 1998, the formation of Fisheries and Aquatic Resources Management Councils (FARMCs) was mandated, providing local engagement in municipal lawmaking.

The use of artificial reefs was banned in 1997, before being reallowed in 2001 under new guidelines. By the 2000s, overfishing in some areas was severe enough that catches with hook-and-line techniques were 1/20th of what they were in the 1940s for the same amount of effort. The 2000s saw an increase in integrated coastal management by local governments, with fisheries considered as part of a wider system alongside marine protected areas. Integrated Coastal Management was officially adopted as a national strategy in 2006. Both integrated coastal management and ecosystem-based fisheries management were amended into the Fisheries Code of 1998 through Republic Act 10654 of 2014. By 2012, around 1,614,000 people were employed in municipal fisheries. Municipal capture fisheries produced 51% of total capture fisheries production.

Municipal fisheries and aquaculture combined produced 73% of all catch from 2011 to 2020. From 2012 to 2021 aquaculture was far more productive than municipal fisheries, whose productivity was in turn slightly higher than that of commercial fisheries. In terms of value the difference was not as large. From 2013 to 2022 the overall volume of commodities produced from municipal fisheries decreased from 1.26 million metric tons to 1.13 million metric tons. However, the value of produced commodities increased from PhP 80.90 billion to PhP 127.63 billion.

The Bureau of Fisheries and Aquatic Resources issued Fisheries Administrative Order 263 (FAO 263) in 2019, dividing Philippine waters into 12 Fisheries Management Areas taking into account geography and fish stock distribution. Under this system, each area is expected to have its own management body and scientific advisory group, which will prepare a Fisheries Management Area Plan that is responsive to the needs of that fishing management area. In addition to creating more tailored sustainability plans, the FMAs are intended to improve governance and the enforcement of fishery laws and regulations. Implementation of the new FMAs lagged behind the laws. By mid-2021, 11 FMAs had been established, although only 6 of the originally 12 FMAs had established scientific advisory groups, and funding and reporting structures were still undefined. Some of these delays were caused by the COVID-19 pandemic in the Philippines. The pandemic with its reduction in enforcement activities also saw an increase in IUU fishing in municipal waters. BFAR and USAID released tools to allow local communities to estimate the prevalence of IUU fishing in their local waters. By 2022, all 12 management boards had been organized, and 11 scientific advisory groups had been set up.

In 2021, municipal capture fisheries produced 1.13 million metric tons of product, 26.64% of total fisheries production. Nationally, 2.19 million people were employed in municipal fishing activities, of which 50.03% were in capture fisheries, 11.59% in gleaning activities, and 11.28% in aquaculture. Other fish processing and municipal fishing-related activities employed 189,562 people.

In 2022 there were 2,302,648 fisherfolk registered with BFAR, of which 50.96% were in capture fisheries, 11.27% in aquaculture, 11.18% in gleaning, 6.83% in vending, and 1.96% in processing. Of these registered fisherfolk, 70% were men and 30% were women. Most are older: 9% are 30 or below, with 21.13% aged 31 to 40, 22.97% aged 51 to 60, and 24.42% older than that. The production of municipal fisheries was 1.13 million metric tons, 25.96% of all fisheries production. There were 375,995 municipal fishing vessels registered with local governments.
