= Chinese clam =

The common name Chinese clam may refer to various bivalves originating from south-eastern Asia, e.g.

- Potamocorbula amurensis (overbite clam or Asian clam) of the family Corbulidae
- Sinanodonta woodiana (Chinese pond mussel or Eastern Asiatic freshwater clam) of the family Unionidae
- Sinonovacula constricta (Chinese razor clam or Agemaki clam) of the family Pharidae

== See also ==
- China clam
