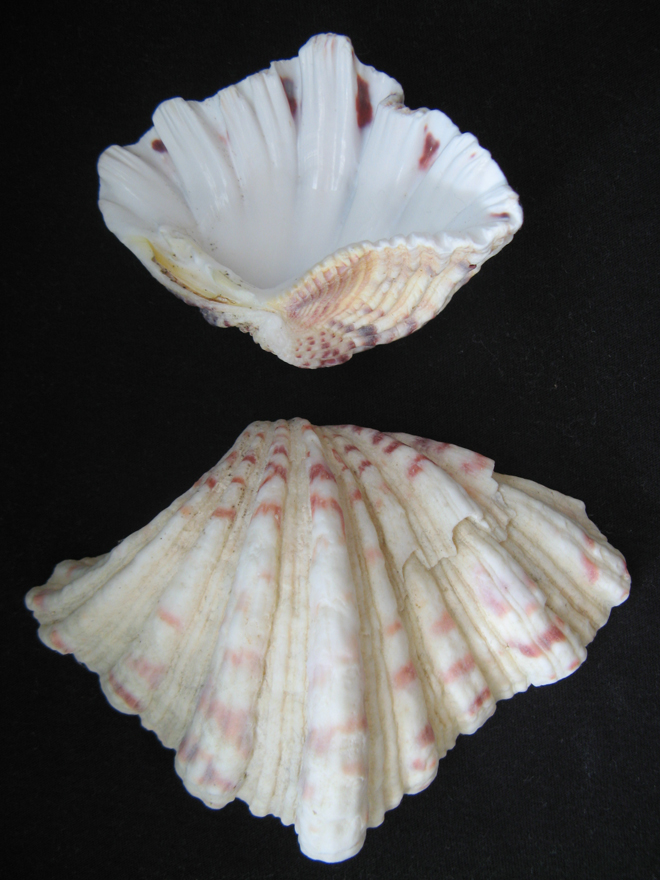
- Hippopus hippopus

Scientific classification
- Kingdom: Animalia
- Phylum: Mollusca
- Class: Bivalvia
- Order: Cardiida
- Superfamily: Cardioidea
- Family: Cardiidae
- Subfamily: Tridacninae
- Genus: Hippopus; Lamarck, 1799

Synonyms
- Cerceis Gistel, 1848 (Replacement name for Hippopus Lamarck, 1799. Invalid: junior homonym of Cerceis Milne Edwards, 1840)

= Hippopus =

Genus of bivalves

Hippopus is a genus of large tropical saltwater clams, marine bivalve molluscs in the subfamily Tridacninae, the giant clam subfamily, of the family Cardiidae.

== Species ==
- Hippopus hippopus (Linnaeus, 1758) (Bear paw clam)
- Hippopus porcellanus Rosewater, 1982 (China clam)

Species brought into synonymy

- Hippopus brassica Bosc, 1801 accepted as Hippopus hippopus (Linnaeus, 1758)
- Hippopus equinus Mörch, 1853 accepted as Hippopus hippopus (Linnaeus, 1758)
- Hippopus maculatus Lamarck, 1801 accepted as Hippopus hippopus (Linnaeus, 1758)
