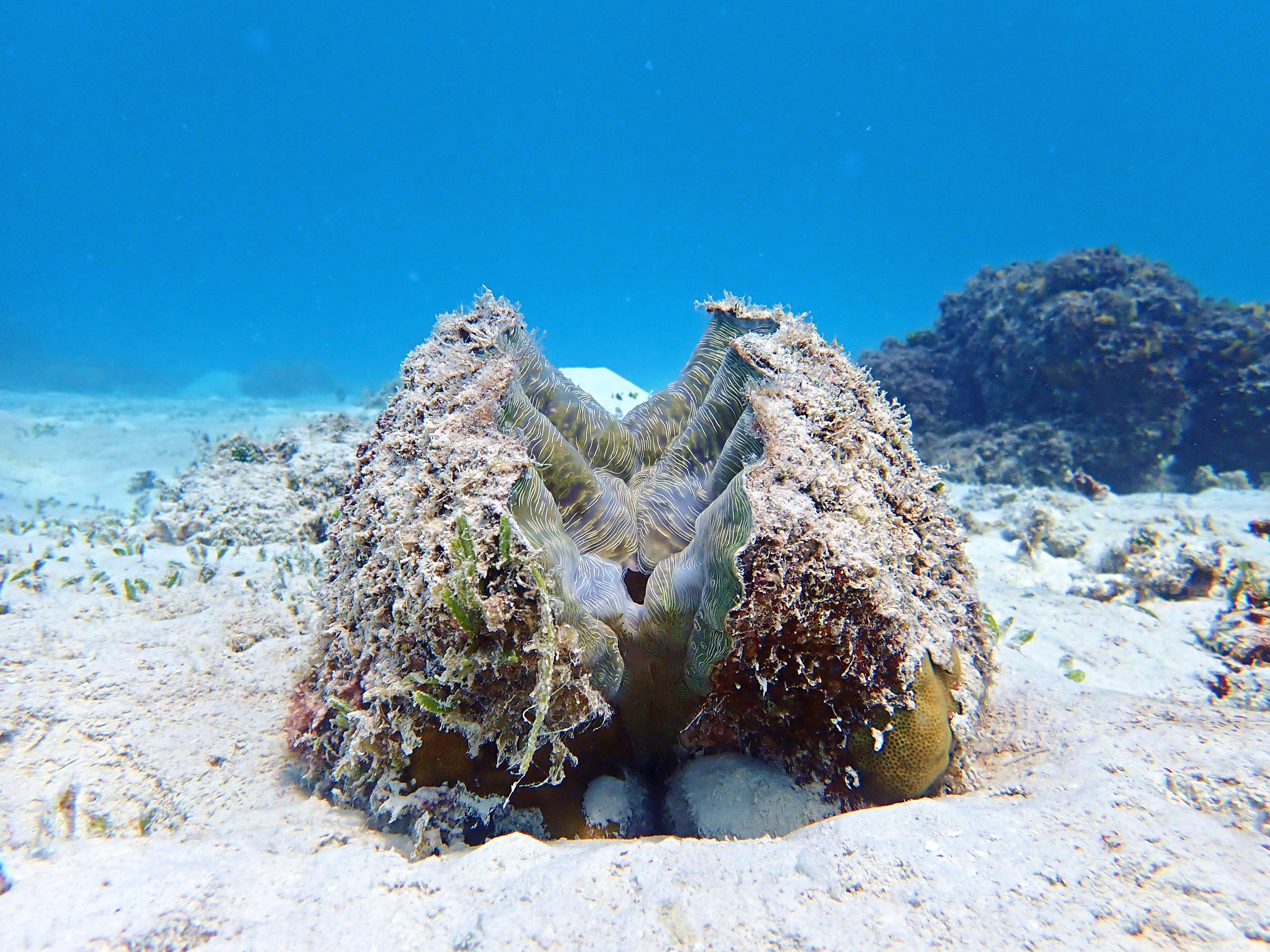
- Live specimen in Vanuatu

Conservation status
- Vulnerable (IUCN 3.1)
- CITES Appendix II

Scientific classification
- Kingdom: Animalia
- Phylum: Mollusca
- Class: Bivalvia
- Order: Cardiida
- Family: Cardiidae
- Genus: Hippopus
- Species: H. hippopus

Binomial name
- Hippopus hippopus (Linnaeus, 1758)

Synonyms
- Chama asinus Barbut, 1788; Chama hippopus Linnaeus, 1758; Hippopus brassica Bosc, 1801; Hippopus equinus Mörch, 1853; Hippopus maculatus Lamarck, 1801; Tridachnes ungula Röding, 1798

= Hippopus hippopus =

Species of mollusc

Hippopus hippopus, also known as the Horse Hoof clam and Strawberry clam, is a species of giant clam in the Subfamily Tridacninae and the genus Hippopus. Hippopus is a delicacy in many Southeast Asian countries due to its high quality meat.

The scientific name hippopus comes from Ancient Greek for "horse foot" (ἵππος, hippos, "horse", and πούς, pous, "foot").

== Distribution and habitat ==
H. hippopus is found in tropical waters of the Indian and Pacific Oceans. It is commonly found on the coast of Indonesia and Palau. Its range extends as far as India in the Indian Ocean, and Kiribati in the Pacific Ocean.

H. hippopus frequently inhabits the shallow waters of fringing, barrier reefs, and seagrass beds. Because H. hippopus inhabits the shallow water, its symbiotic inhabitants can use sunlight to perform photosynthesis for the clam. H. Hippopus does not attach to rocks in the reef, instead, they settle on sandy patches, detached from any reef rocks.

== Feeding ==
=== Tubular system ===
H. hippopus relies heavily on photosynthetic dinoflagellates called zooxanthellae for nutrition. About 65 to 70 percent of a giant clam's nutrition is derived from zooxanthellae. These dinoflagellates are found in the siphonal mantle, and inside a vast tubular system. This tubular system starts at the stomach, where one primary zooxanthellae tube moves through and away from the stomach, branching into two zooxanthellae tubes at the clam's digestive system. Both tubes then travel to the root of the siphonal mantle, where both secondary tubes branch into numerous tertiary zooxanthellae branches. This vast system of tubes allows the zooxanthellae to communicate with the clams stomach through a small opening. A clam's simbiotic relationship with dinoflagellates is unique because the zooxanthellae has a direct relationship with the digestive system of its host.

=== Filter feeding ===
H. hippopus also acquires nutrients through filter feeding, using its inhalant siphon to eat marine microorganisms such as phytoplankton and zooplankton by catching them on ciliated tracts on their gill plates. The amount of carbon a clam acquires using this mechanism is determined by the size of the clam, with smaller clams acquiring approximately 60% of their carbon from this method, and larger clams receiving approximately 34% from filter feeding plankton.

== Anatomy and morphology ==
The H. hippopus shell is characterized as having strawberry blotches in the shape of bands on the exterior of the shell. Their mantle is a green-yellow color, with tightly fitting interlocking ridges. The shape of the shell is sub-rhomboidal and bears deeps ridges that stretch vertically across the surface of the shell. In comparison to its cousins, H. hippopus is relatively average in size among the tridacnines, averaging 22 cm (8.7 in) and reaching maximums lengths of 45 cm (18 in). Unlike with other bivalves, the hinge of H. hippopus is adjacent to the substrate, with the inhalant siphon and mantle tissues facing towards the surface of the water. This maximizes the photosynthetic capapbilities of the photosynthetic dinoflagellates that harvest the sun's rays, producing the clam's distinct vibrant pigmentation.

== Reproduction ==
H. hippopus clams are protandrous hermaphrodites, first developing male gonads, eventually becoming a hermaphrodite after the development of their female gonadal cells. To reproduce, sperm is first released into the water column, then eggs are expelled and fertilised. This expulsion of reproductive cells will also trigger other clams to expel sperm and eggs cells, increasing the probability that eggs are fertilised in the water column. Egg cells have been found to be viable for approximately 4 to 6 hours, which causes larger communities of H. hippopus to have higher reproductive success due to a higher volume of reproductive cells.

== Development ==
The larvae then go through a planktonic stage, where juvenile H. hippopus meroplankton is free swimming, developing cilium for locomotion. As the larvae grow, the clam looks for a suitable place to settle, while additionally beginning to develop its foot organ and bivalve shell. H. hippopus settles on sandy substrate, unlike its cousins in the genus Tridacna, which attaches itself to a rocky substrate. After 6 to 14 days, the development of a muscular foot causes metamorphoses to a benthic lifestyle. H. hippopus then begins to crawl to find an optimal substrate. Once found, the clam loses its locomotion, and proceeds to live a sessile lifestyle. After 25 days, juvenile H. hippopus acquire zooxanthellae, which causes a sharp incline in growth due to a new source of food for the clam.

== Conservation ==
Due to being in a shallow water environment, this species is often harvested for its beautiful shell and its meat, consumed in several Pacific and Asian countries. However, its extremely slow growth and reproduction make such harvesting unsustainable: stocks can take several decades to recover after just one harvest. Hence, the species is considered overfished in many countries and may even be extinct in several of them.

Aquaculture operations have started at the National Aquaculture Center (NAC) in Kosrae, Micronesia. The private company MMME, which now runs NAC, has provided seed stocks for local community farms.

The species is less often encountered in the reef aquarium hobby than Tridacna, but is growing in popularity, despite being noted as needing very high levels of artificial light to grow compared to some Tridacna species.

This species is now part of the IUCN Red List of Threatened Species, and its international trade is regulated by the Convention on International Trade in Endangered Species of Wild Fauna and Flora.

== Gallery ==
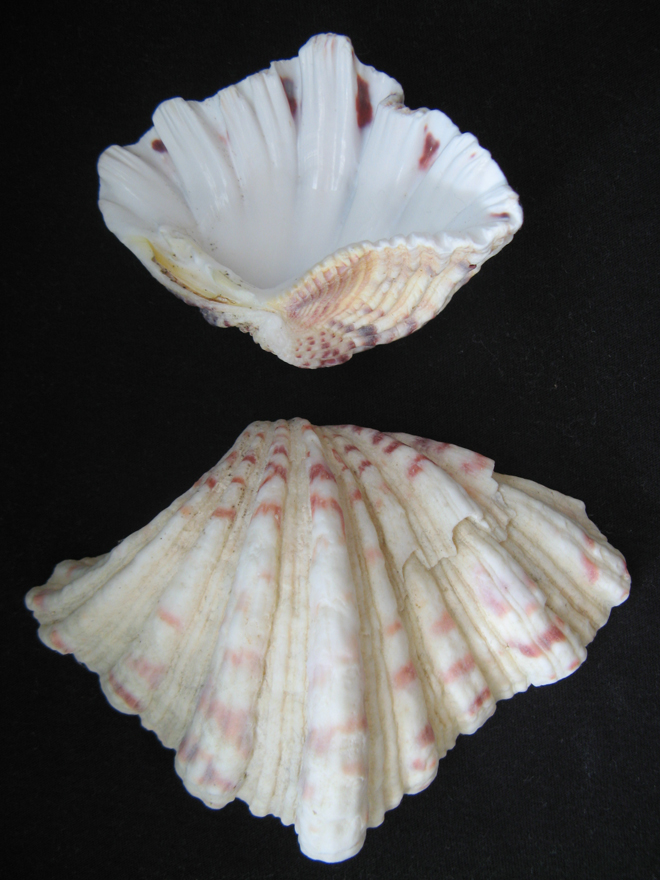
Shell

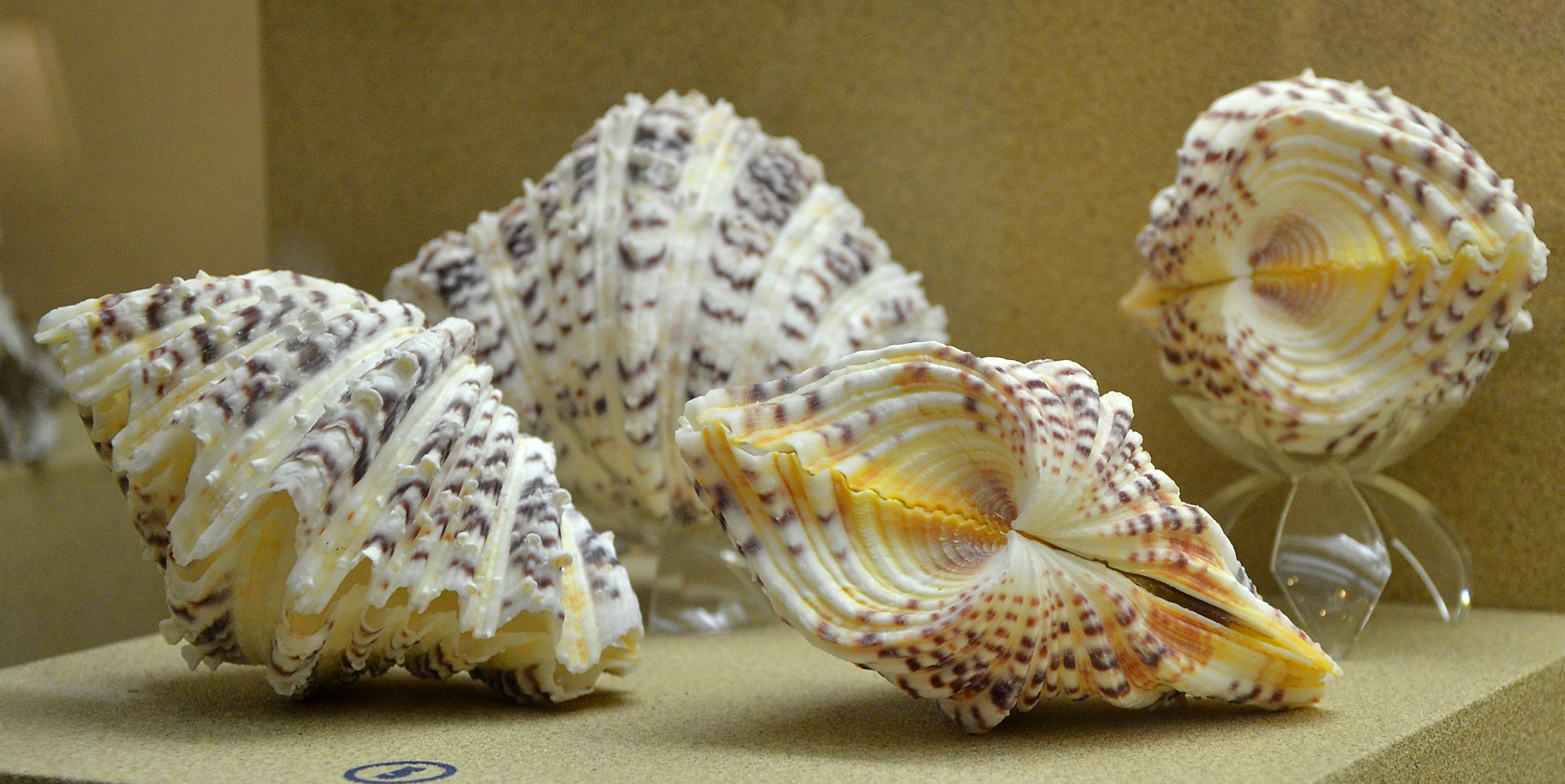
Shells

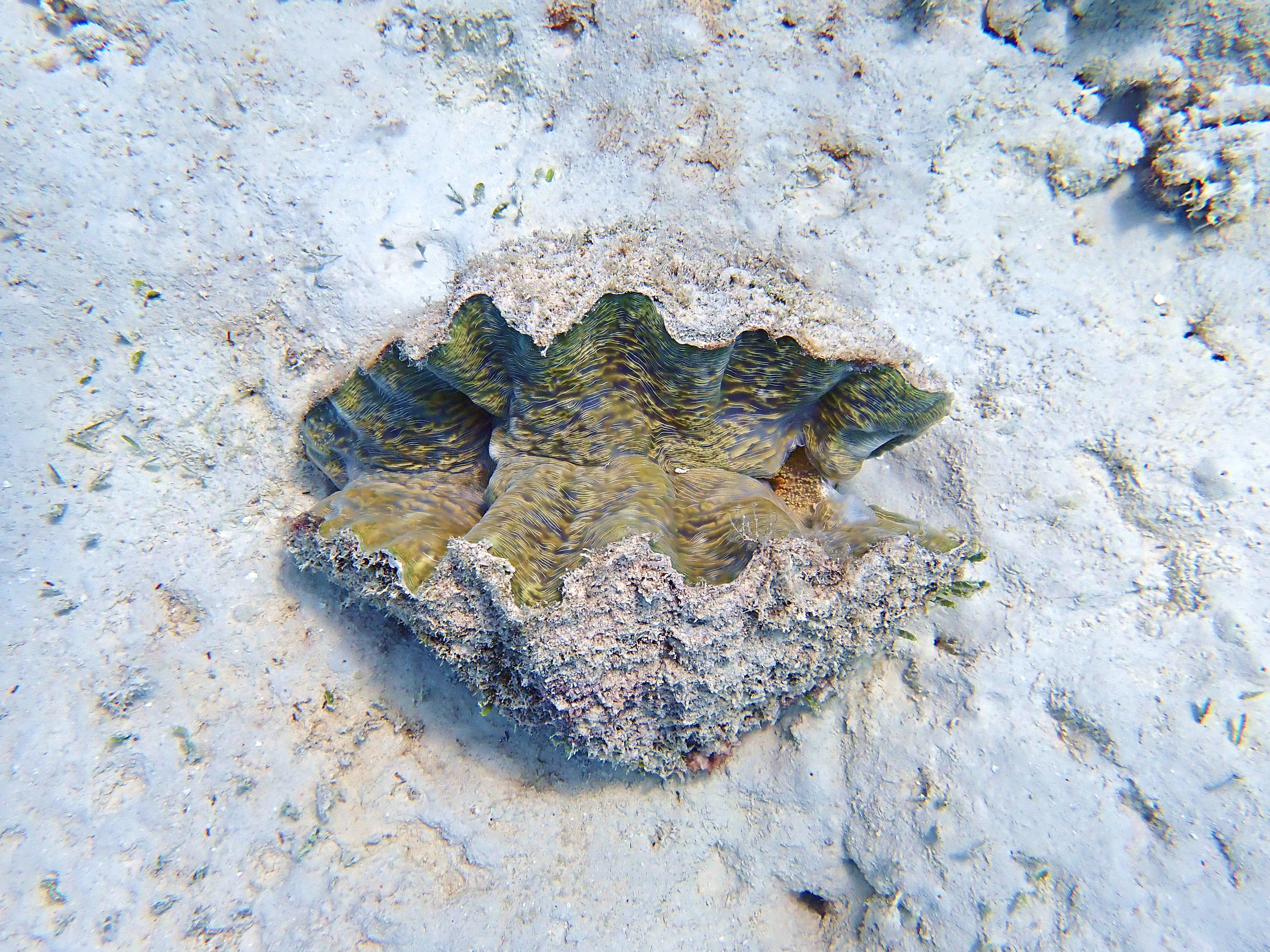
Live specimen, seen from above
