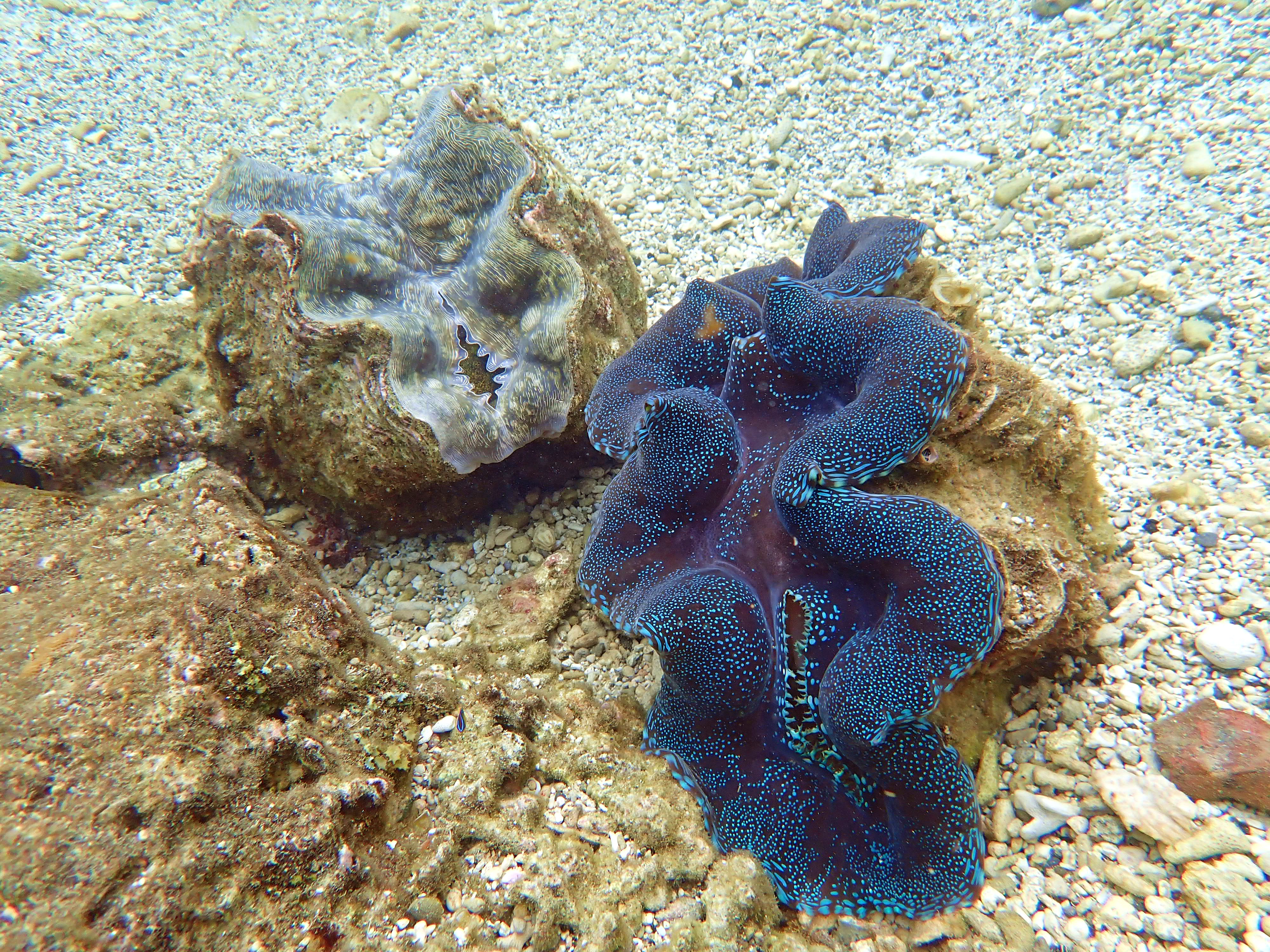
- Two "giant clams", from the two current genera : Hippopus hippopus & Tridacna squamosa.

Scientific classification
- Kingdom: Animalia
- Phylum: Mollusca
- Class: Bivalvia
- Order: Cardiida
- Family: Cardiidae
- Subfamily: Tridacninae; Lamarck, 1819

Genera
- See text

= Tridacninae =

Tridacninae Temporal range: Eocene–present, 55–0 Ma

Subfamily of bivalves

Tridacninae, common name the giant clams, is a taxonomic subfamily of very large saltwater clams, marine bivalve molluscs in the family Cardiidae, the cockles.

== Description ==
This subfamily contains the largest living bivalve species, including Tridacna gigas, the giant clam. They have heavy shells, fluted with 4–6 folds. The mantle is usually brightly colored. They inhabit coral reefs in warm seas in the Indo-Pacific region. Most of these clams live in symbiosis with photosynthetic dinoflagellates (zooxanthellae), a type of photosymbiosis.

== Systematics ==
Sometimes the giant clams are still treated as a separate family Tridacnidae, but modern phylogenetic analyses included them in the family Cardiidae as a subfamily. Two recent genera and eight species are known:

- Hippopus—2 species
- Tridacna—10 species

Recent genetic evidence has shown them to be monophyletic sister taxa.

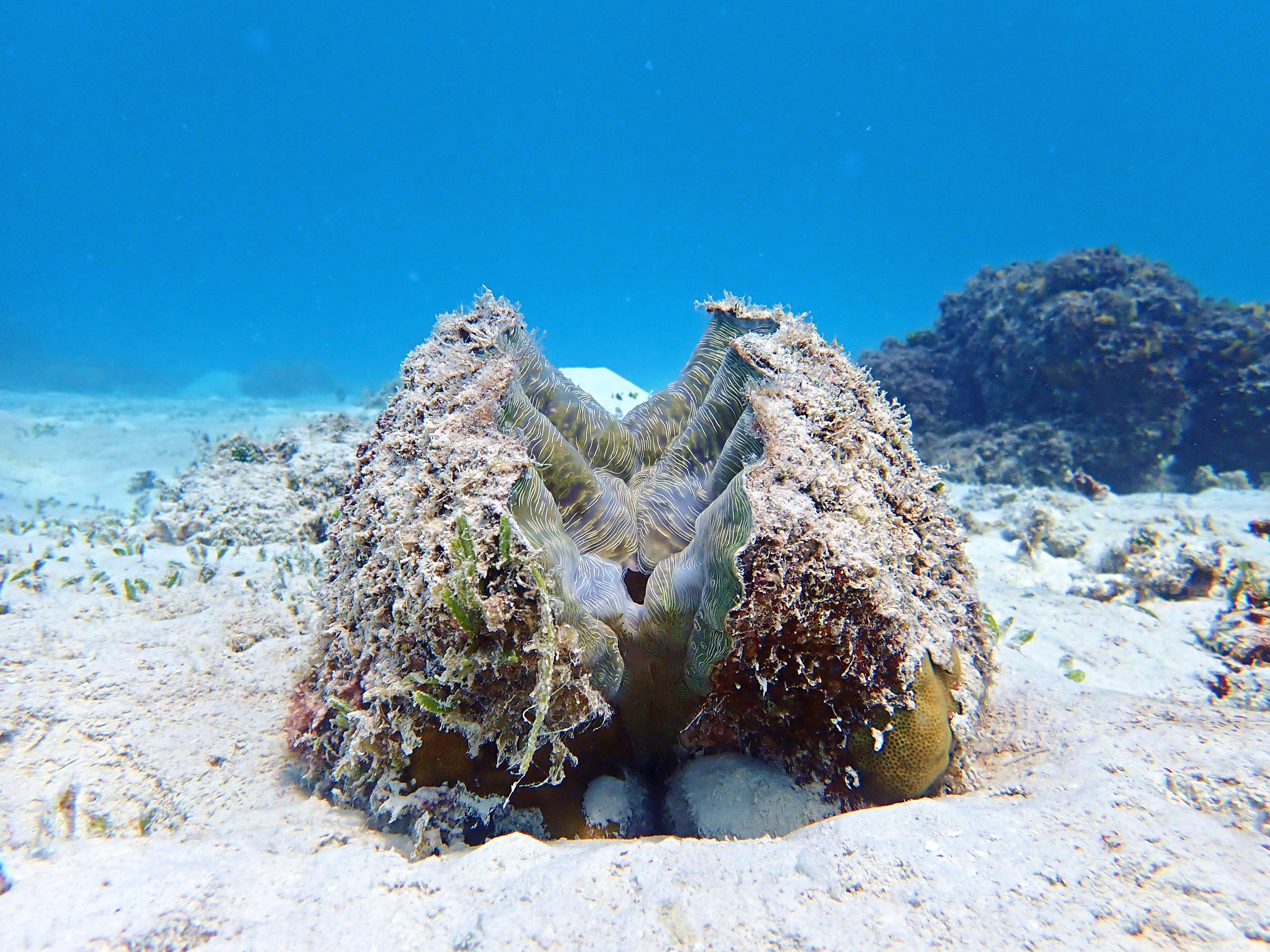
Live Hippopus hippopus (Vanuatu)

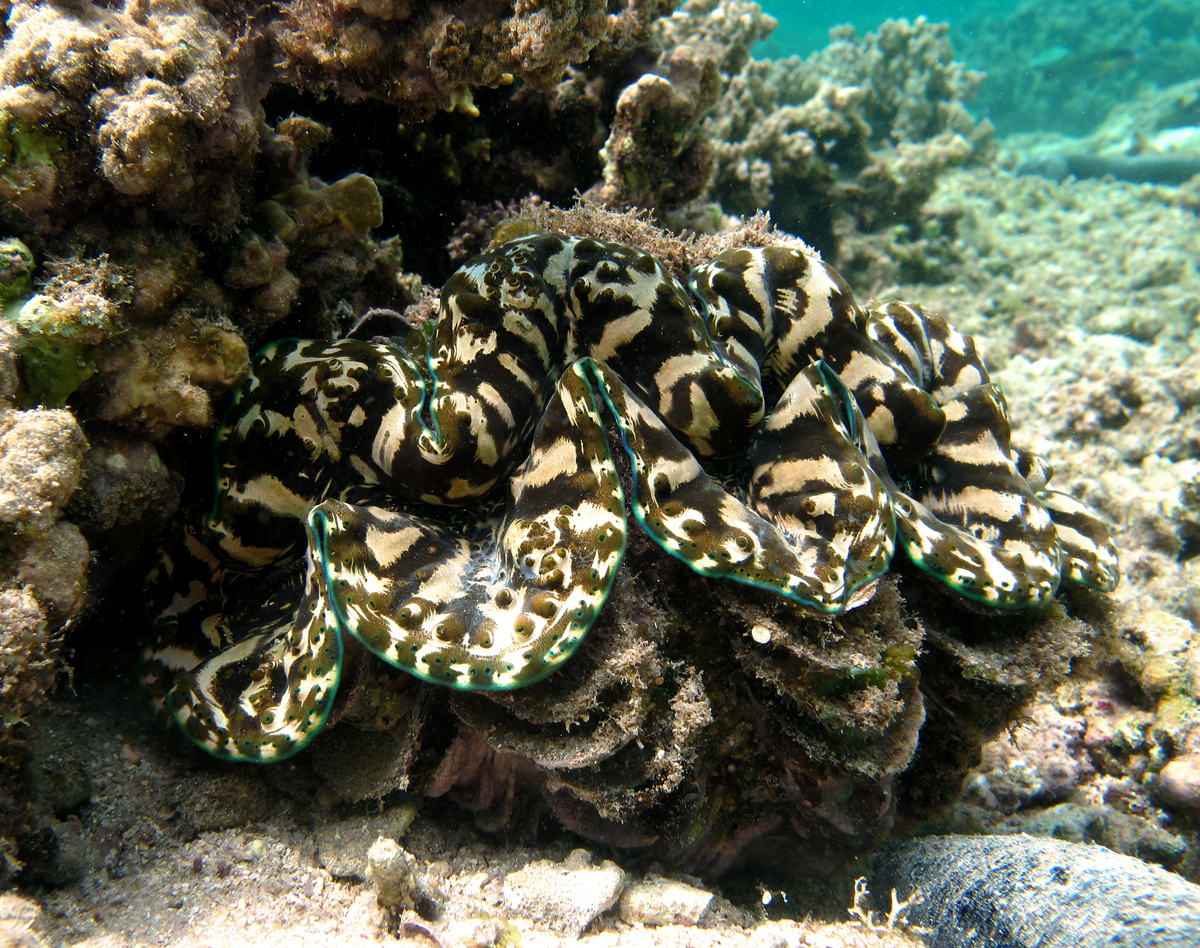
Live Tridacna squamosa (la Réunion)

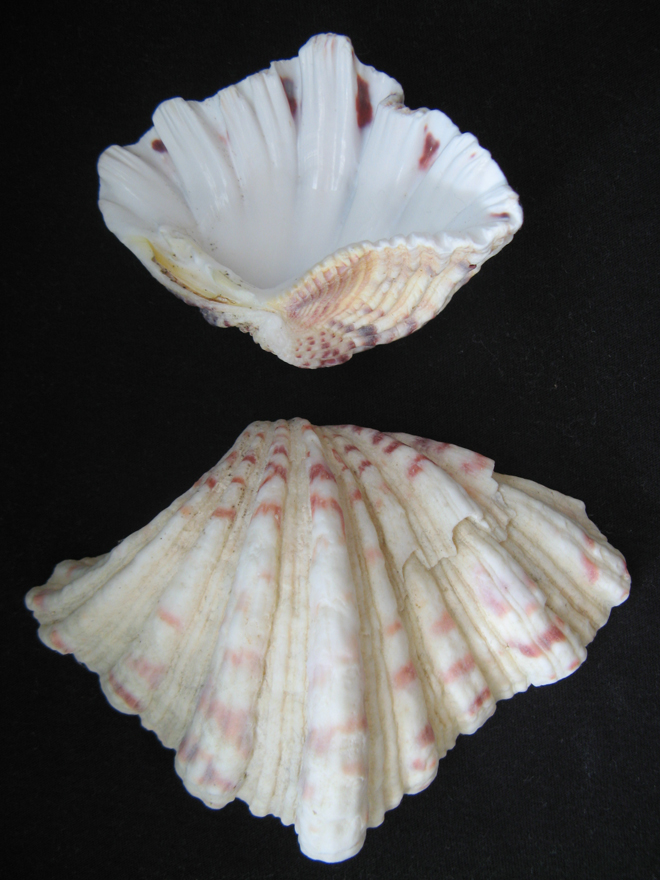
Hippopus hippopus shells

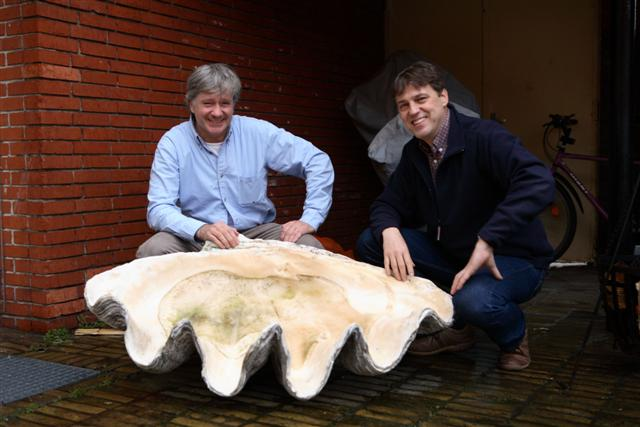
Giant clam (Tridacna gigas) shell

== Human relevance ==
In some areas, such as the Philippines, smaller members of the subfamily are farmed to supply the marine aquarium trade and food trade towards east Asia. All species in the Tridacninae family are protected under CITES Appendix II meaning international trade requires CITES permits to be granted.

== Evolutionary history ==
Tridacinae originated in Western Europe during the Eocene, expanding eastwards towards Arabia by the Oligocene, and becoming established in its modern distribution in the Indo-Pacific during the Pliocene-Pleistocene.
