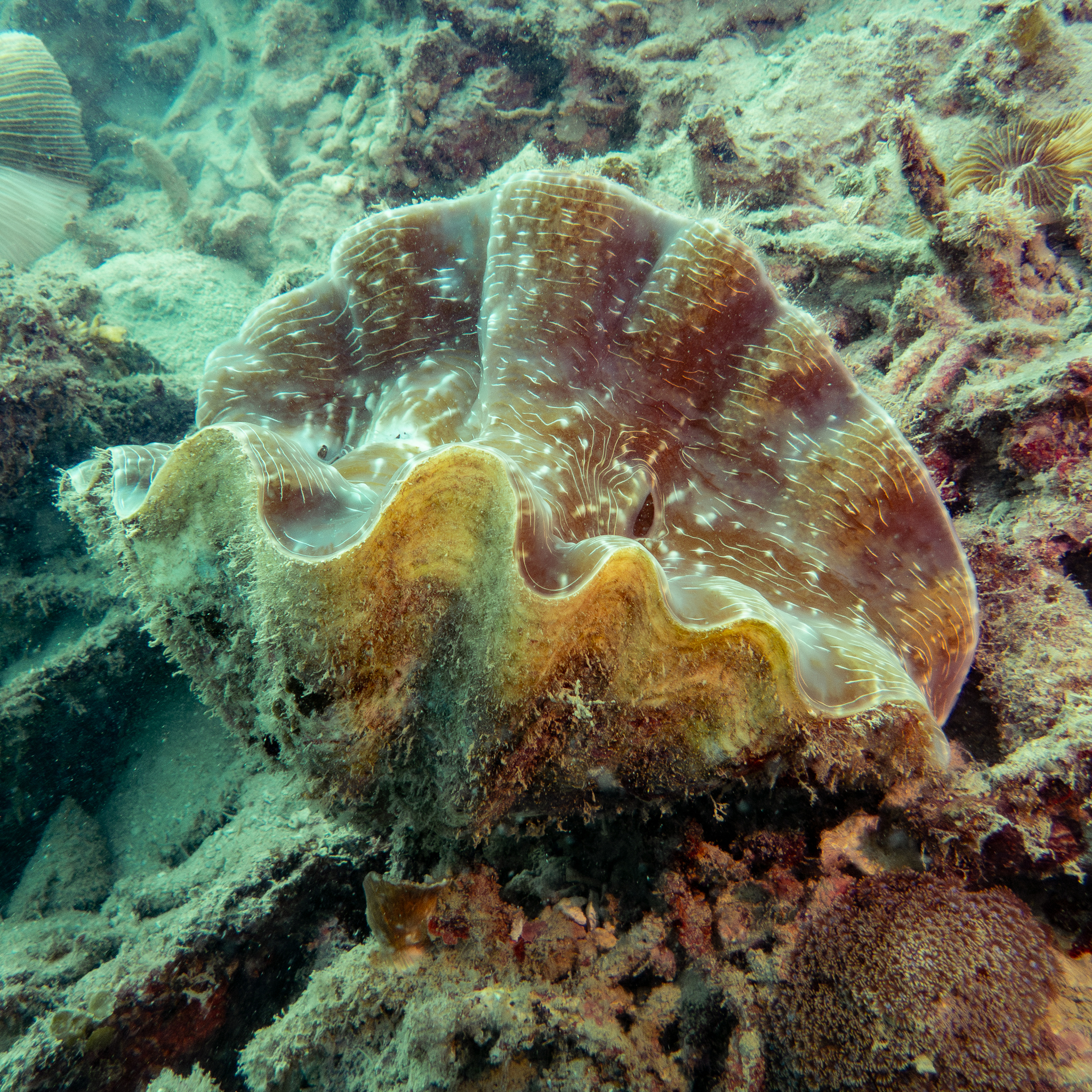
- Near Palawan

Conservation status
- Vulnerable (IUCN 3.1)
- CITES Appendix II

Scientific classification
- Kingdom: Animalia
- Phylum: Mollusca
- Class: Bivalvia
- Order: Cardiida
- Family: Cardiidae
- Genus: Hippopus
- Species: H. porcellanus

Binomial name
- Hippopus porcellanus Rosewater, 1982

= Hippopus porcellanus =

China clam

Species of bivalve

Hippopus porcellanus, the china clam, is a species of bivalve in the subfamily Tridacninae. It is found in Indonesia, Palau, and the Philippines.
