= Conservation International Philippines =

Country program of Conservation International in the Philippines

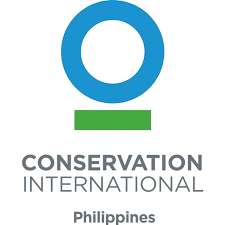
- Abbreviation: CI Philippines
- Formation: 1995
- Type: Country program
- Headquarters: Quezon City, Metro Manila, Philippines
- Region served: Philippines
- Fields: Biodiversity conservation, conservation science, marine conservation, sustainable landscape management
- Parent organization: Conservation International
- Website: www.conservation.org/places/philippines

Conservation International Philippines is the Philippines country program of Conservation International. Its work has included protected-area and forest conservation in southern Palawan, marine protected-area network development in the Verde Island Passage, and local partnership in the United Nations Development Programme project Strengthening the Marine Protected Area System to Conserve Marine Key Biodiversity Areas (Smart Seas Philippines) from 2014 to 2020.

Conservation-finance work linked to the program has also included conservation-agreement, trust-fund, and carbon-finance initiatives in southern Palawan, while marine work has extended across seascapes such as Tañon Strait, Lanuza Bay, and Davao Gulf.

== Overview ==
Conservation International Philippines is headquartered in Quezon City in Metro Manila and maintains field offices in Puerto Princesa and Brooke's Point in Palawan. Its geographic scope has included southern Palawan, the Verde Island Passage, and marine seascapes such as Tañon Strait, Lanuza Bay, and Davao Gulf, while conservation planning in the Philippine hotspot also emphasized corridor-scale priorities in the Sierra Madre, Palawan, and Eastern Mindanao.

Its thematic work has included protected areas and forest conservation, marine protected-area governance, conservation science, and conservation finance. These strands have included conservation-agreement approaches around Mount Mantalingahan, local-government collaboration on marine protected-area networking in the Verde Island Passage, and support for management-effectiveness and capacity-development work in marine key biodiversity areas under Smart Seas Philippines.

== History ==
Conservation International established a program in the Philippines in 1995, with work spanning terrestrial and marine conservation priorities.

In the early 2000s, CI Philippines was linked to corridor-scale conservation planning in the Sierra Madre, Palawan, and Eastern Mindanao, while marine planning in the Sulu-Sulawesi Marine Ecoregion advanced through a transboundary conservation framework shared by the Philippines, Malaysia, and Indonesia.

From 2008 to 2011, Conservation International Philippines supported local-government alliances involved in establishing a network of marine protected areas in the Verde Island Passage. During that period, alliances coordinated protection of about 17,000 hectares (170 km^{2}) through 69 marine protected areas.

In 2009, southern Palawan conservation work contributed to the proclamation of the Mount Mantalingahan protected landscape after earlier local-government proposals, consultations, and planning with technical support involving Conservation International Philippines.

From 2014 to 2020, Conservation International Philippines was a local partner for the United Nations Development Programme project Strengthening the Marine Protected Area System to Conserve Marine Key Biodiversity Areas (Smart Seas Philippines).

== Programs and operations ==
Selected program locations mentioned in the article (1 Quezon City; 2 Puerto Princesa; 3 Brooke's Point; 4 Mount Mantalingahan; 5 Verde Island Passage; 6 Isabela (northern Sierra Madre); 7 Tañon Strait; 8 Lanuza Bay; 9 Davao Gulf)

=== Southern Palawan and Mount Mantalingahan ===
In southern Palawan, Conservation International Philippines has worked around Mount Mantalingahan through conservation agreements that linked watershed restoration and forest protection with livelihood support for communities in the protected landscape. This work was also framed as part of disaster risk reduction: participatory conservation and associated livelihood programs were presented as helping reduce flooding and landslide risks in several municipalities while also supporting community forestry enterprises and local water cooperatives.

The Mount Mantalingahan landscape has continued to face pressure from illegal logging, mining applications overlapping protected and watershed zones, and other upland land-use pressures in southern Palawan. Reporting on Pala'wan communities in the protected landscape has also emphasized community stewardship, describing organic and agroforestry farming practices as helping conserve old-growth forest and watersheds even as farmers faced low returns and nearby mining pressures.

=== Sierra Madre and Luzon conservation priorities ===
In Luzon, CI Philippines was linked to national priority-setting that emphasized corridor-scale conservation in the Sierra Madre as one of the country's major terrestrial priorities. Later Key Biodiversity Area prioritization identified 128 terrestrial and freshwater key biodiversity areas in 2006 and 123 marine key biodiversity areas in 2009, producing 228 integrated priority sites that represented habitat for 855 globally important species.

=== Verde Island Passage marine protected-area network ===
In the Verde Island Passage, Conservation International Philippines supported inter-local-government collaboration on a marine protected-area network intended to improve biodiversity outcomes and fisheries management. In the mid-2000s, CI-Philippines initiated a marine biodiversity program in the Verde Island Passage Marine Biodiversity Conservation Corridor as part of the Sulu-Sulawesi Seascape project, and later worked with the provincial government and coastal municipalities on marine protected areas and enforcement initiatives.

By 2011, the passage had 69 established marine protected areas covering about 17,000 hectares (170 km^{2}) of marine waters. Governance of the network was organized through collaborating local-government clusters, including provincial networks in Batangas and Oriental Mindoro and a municipal collaboration between Lubang and Looc, with coordinated patrolling, information-sharing on illegal fishing, annual monitoring, and joint support for management beyond single-municipality jurisdictions.

Management assessments produced mixed but generally positive governance findings. One 2014 assessment rated Batangas fair overall in one scoring rubric, partly because many of its MPAs were relatively new and community awareness was less developed than in the other networks studied. The same assessment nevertheless found high governance capacity and low urgency of threats in Batangas in a separate strengths-weaknesses-opportunities-threats analysis, which it linked to coordination, transparency, accountability, and provincial-government leadership. Review and case-study literature also identified faster MPA establishment, better sharing of experience across local governments, and stronger support for individual MPAs as important benefits of network expansion, while noting the costs of building consensus across larger areas and the uneven distribution of conservation costs and benefits among municipalities as continuing challenges.

=== Smart Seas Philippines seascapes ===
From 2014 to 2020, Conservation International Philippines was one of the local responsible partners in the United Nations Development Programme project Strengthening the Marine Protected Area System to Conserve Marine Key Biodiversity Areas (Smart Seas Philippines). The project worked across five seascape sites (southern Palawan, the Verde Island Passage, Tañon Strait, Lanuza Bay, and Davao Gulf) covering about 2,546,188 hectares (25,462 km^{2}) of municipal waters and 21 marine key biodiversity areas, and supported capacity development for management effectiveness in 128 marine protected areas and 69 local government units.

By the close of the project, overall outcomes were rated satisfactory and the likelihood of sustainability was rated likely. The evaluation also found that the project had helped consolidate marine protected-area networks in the Verde Island Passage, Lanuza Bay, Davao Gulf, and Palawan sites, alongside improvements in management structures, management planning, and site-level capacity scores.

Within associated marine-planning work, Lanuza Bay served as a model site for rolling out marine protected-area design tools to Davao Gulf and the Verde Island Passage.

Selected programme landscapes and seascapes of Conservation International Philippines
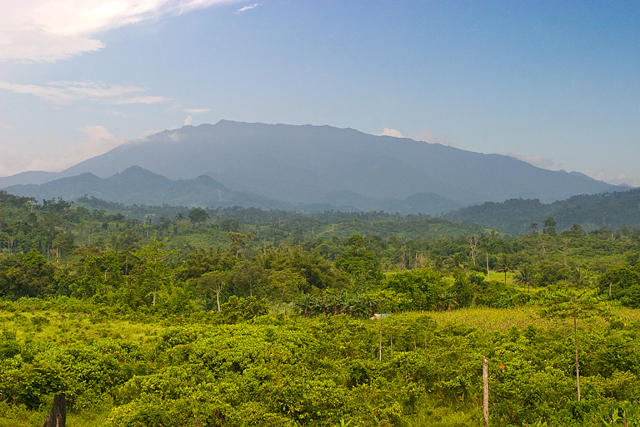
Mount Mantalingahan in southern Palawan, where CI Philippines has supported protected-landscape and conservation-agreement work

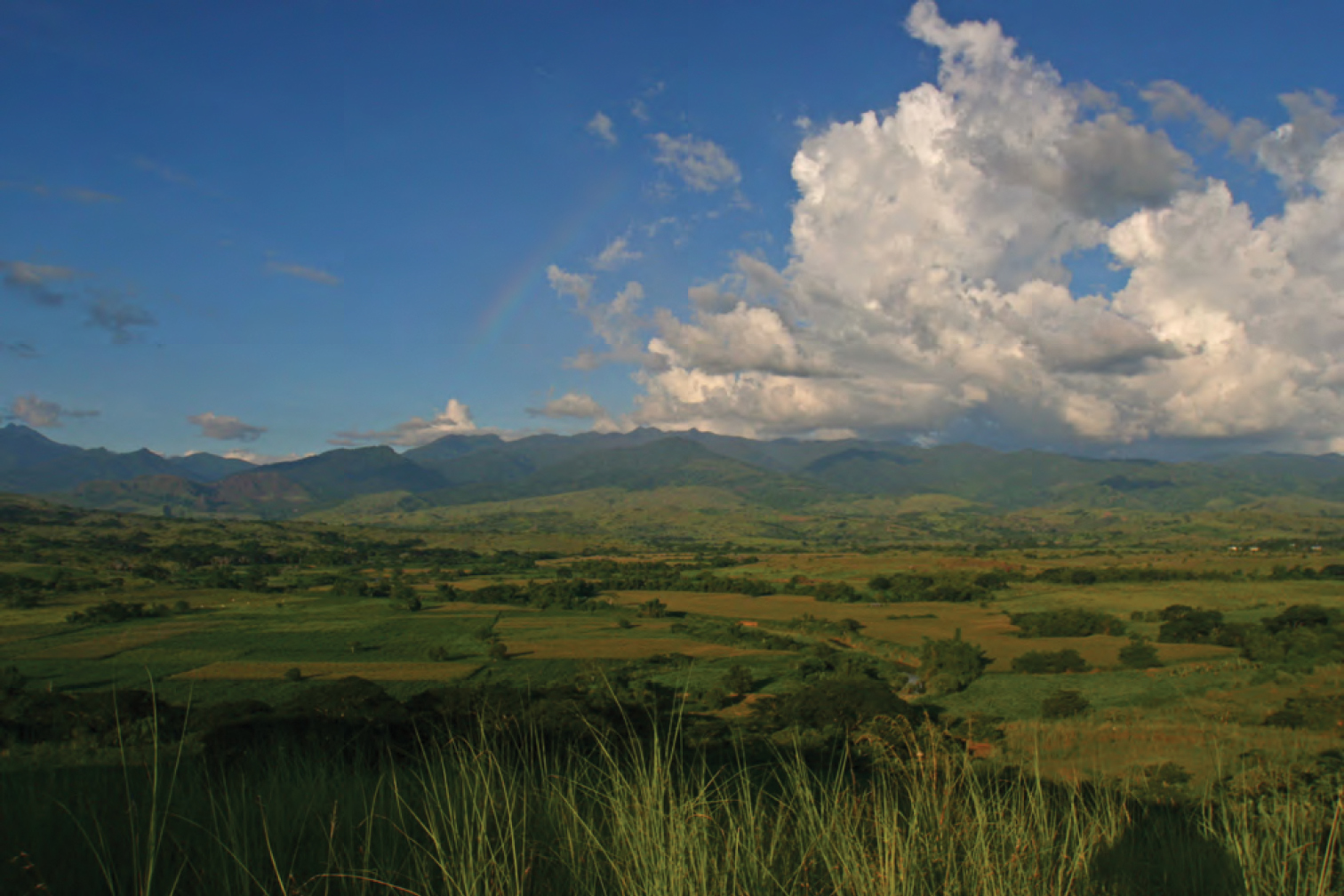
The Sierra Madre in Isabela, one of the corridor-scale conservation priorities identified in national biodiversity planning

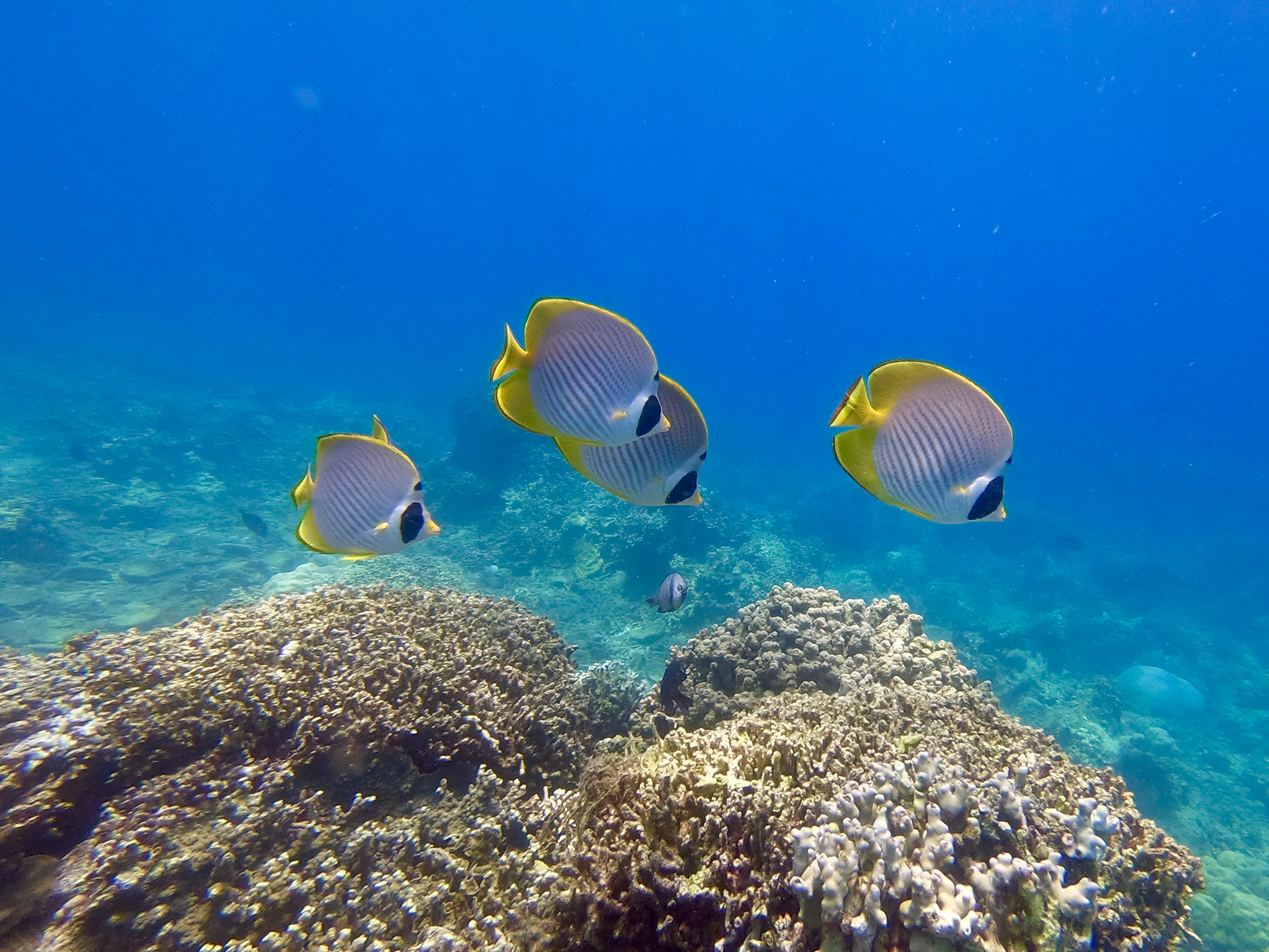
Coral reef at Verde Island, in the Verde Island Passage marine biodiversity corridor

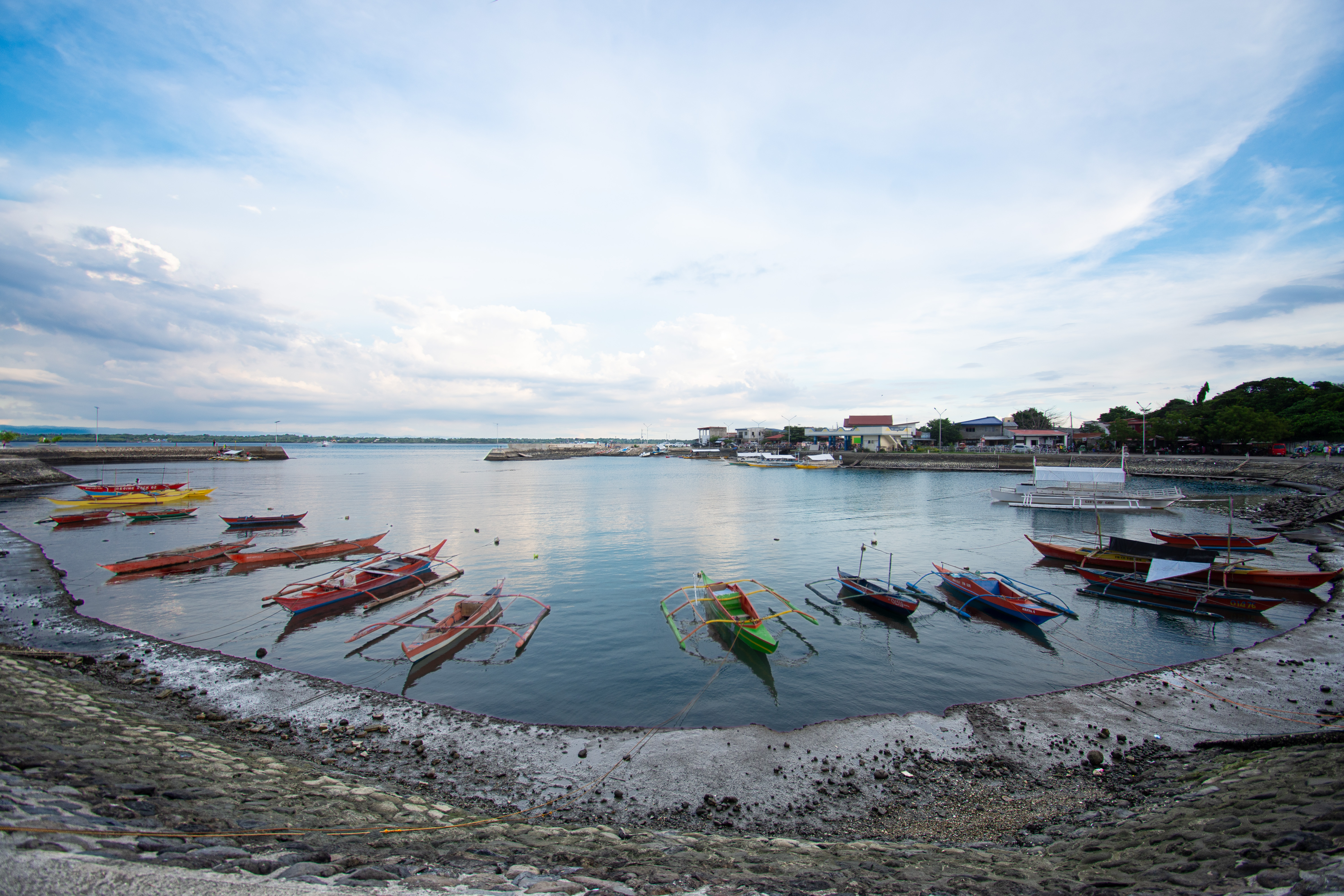
Tañon Strait, one of the Smart Seas Philippines seascapes

== Partnerships ==
Recurring public and institutional partners in Conservation International Philippines' work have included the Department of Environment and Natural Resources and its Biodiversity Management Bureau, the Bureau of Fisheries and Aquatic Resources, the United Nations Development Programme, and local government units involved in marine protected-area and seascape governance. In Batangas, collaboration in the Verde Island Passage also ran through the provincial Strategic Environmental Management Plan, the Batangas Environmental Protection Council, and the Provincial Government-Environment and Natural Resources Office, while southern Palawan protected-area work involved local governments and environmental authorities in the establishment of Mount Mantalingahan.

Community and technical partners have included Indigenous Pala'wan communities, community forestry enterprises, and local water cooperatives in Mount Mantalingahan conservation agreements, as well as coastal communities and Bantay Dagat volunteers in the Verde Island Passage network. In Smart Seas Philippines, CI Philippines worked alongside other local responsible partners and science institutions, including Haribon Foundation, the National Fisheries Research and Development Institute, Rare, WWF Philippines, and the UP Marine Science Institute.

== Funding and conservation finance ==
In southern Palawan, a conservation trust fund was launched in 2016 for the Mount Mantalingahan Protected Landscape and was described as the first of its kind for a national protected area in the Philippines. It was intended to provide long-term financing for biodiversity protection in the landscape while also supporting livelihood diversification for local Indigenous communities facing pressure from logging and mining. Separate reporting in 2025 described a carbon-finance initiative under development with two ancestral domains inside the Mount Mantalingahan landscape. That agreement was presented as a way to quantify and verify forest carbon, reduce deforestation, and channel future revenues into conservation managed by Indigenous communities, but the coverage treated it as a reported development rather than as an already operating revenue stream.

At seascape level, financial sustainability was one of the core outcomes under Smart Seas Philippines. The terminal evaluation found that project-developed biodiversity-friendly enterprise plans were based on market and financial analysis and that 25 such enterprises had the potential to cover an average of 56 percent of the current financial gap for 25 marine protected areas. It also reported implementation of sustainable financing plans in multiple sites in Batangas and Mindoro, alongside business planning and enterprise development in Palawan and other seascapes, although some activities and operations were slowed by the COVID-19 pandemic.

== Impact and evaluation ==
By the close of the Smart Seas Philippines project, overall outcomes were rated satisfactory and the likelihood of sustainability was rated likely. The evaluation credited the project with consolidating marine protected-area networks in the Verde Island Passage, Lanuza Bay, Davao Gulf, and Palawan sites, while also reporting improvements in management structures, management planning, and site-level capacity scores across the five seascapes.

Assessment literature on the Verde Island Passage pointed to qualified but generally positive governance results. A 2014 management-performance study rated Batangas fair overall in one scoring rubric, largely because many of its marine protected areas were still relatively new and community awareness was lower than in the other networks examined. In the same study's strengths-weaknesses-opportunities-threats analysis, however, Batangas showed high governance capacity and low urgency of threats, which was associated with coordination, transparency, accountability, and provincial leadership.

A case study presented the Mount Mantalingahan conservation-agreement model as helping reduce flood and landslide risk through watershed protection, while linking local livelihood support and community participation to forest stewardship in the protected landscape.

== See also ==
- Environmental issues in the Philippines
- Deforestation in the Philippines
