= Isla Verde =

Isla Verde (English: Green Island) can refer to:

- Isla Verde, Puerto Rico
  - Isla Verde International Airport, unofficial name of Luis Muñoz Marín International Airport
- Verde Island, Batangas, Philippines
  - Isla Verde Passage, the strait near this island
- La Palma, Canary Islands, Spain, which is nicknamed Isla Verde
