= Frederik van Pallandt =

Dutch singer (1934 – 1994)

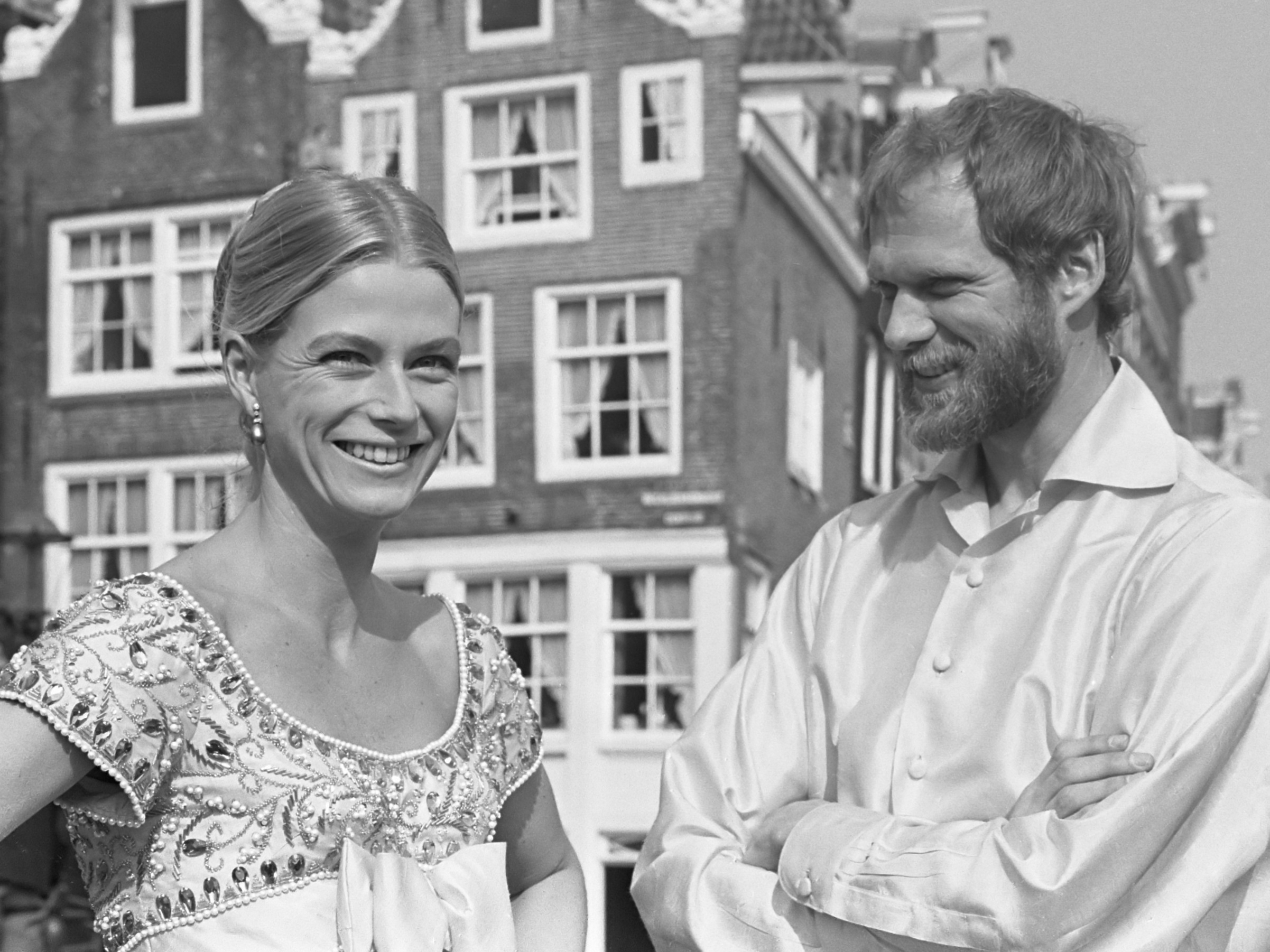
Nina and Frederik in Amsterdam, making a TV show (13 April 1967)

Frederik Jan Gustav Floris, Baron van Pallandt (4 May 1934 – 15 May 1994) was a Dutch singer best known as the male, guitar-playing half of the singing duo Nina & Frederik, which was together from the late 1950s to the late 1960s.

Van Pallandt was born in Copenhagen, the son of Floris Carsilius Anne, Baron van Pallandt, a former Ambassador for the Netherlands to Denmark and South Africa, and Dane Else Dagmar Hanina, Komtesse Blücher af Altona. His uncle, Egbert Carl Antony, Baron van Pallandt (changed to Palland for political reasons) emigrated to South Africa. He and his first wife, Nina van Pallandt, created a sensation first in Denmark and then elsewhere in Europe with music rooted in folk, ethnic, and calypso styles and, at first, their plain stage attire.

The couple had three children: Floris Nicolas Ali, Baron van Pallandt (10 June 1961 – 13 October 2006), Kirsa Eleonore Clara, Baroness van Pallandt (born 9 August 1963), and Ana Maria Else, Baroness van Pallandt (born 30 October 1965) and continued their musical careers until they parted in 1969, with their marriage eventually dissolved in 1976.

Van Pallandt had a daughter, born out of wedlock, with Danish model Dorthe Holm Jensen of London: Beatrice van Pallandt (born 30 September 1967), who married in June 1990 Jeffrey-Werner Graf von der Schulenburg, a management consultant in London, and who had a long-term affair with Prince Karim Aga Khan.

The year following his divorce, Van Pallandt married, on 10 May 1977, María Jesus de Los Rios y Coello de Portugal. Together, they had one child: Daniel Tilopa, Baron van Pallandt (born 12 May 1977). In 1984, van Pallandt bought Burke's Peerage from The Holdway Group.

According to his first wife's memoir, Van Pallandt was an avid sailor and settled in the Philippines in the 1990s. He became involved with an Australian syndicate involved in the trafficking of cannabis, using his yacht the Tiaping to transport the shipments. On 15 May 1994, both he and his Filipina girlfriend Susannah were shot dead in a hut at Puerto Galera in the Philippines. The murderer is believed to have been another member of the syndicate. He was buried near his parents' grave in IJhorst in the Netherlands.
