= Nina van Pallandt =

Danish singer and actress (born 1932)

Nina, Baroness van Pallandt
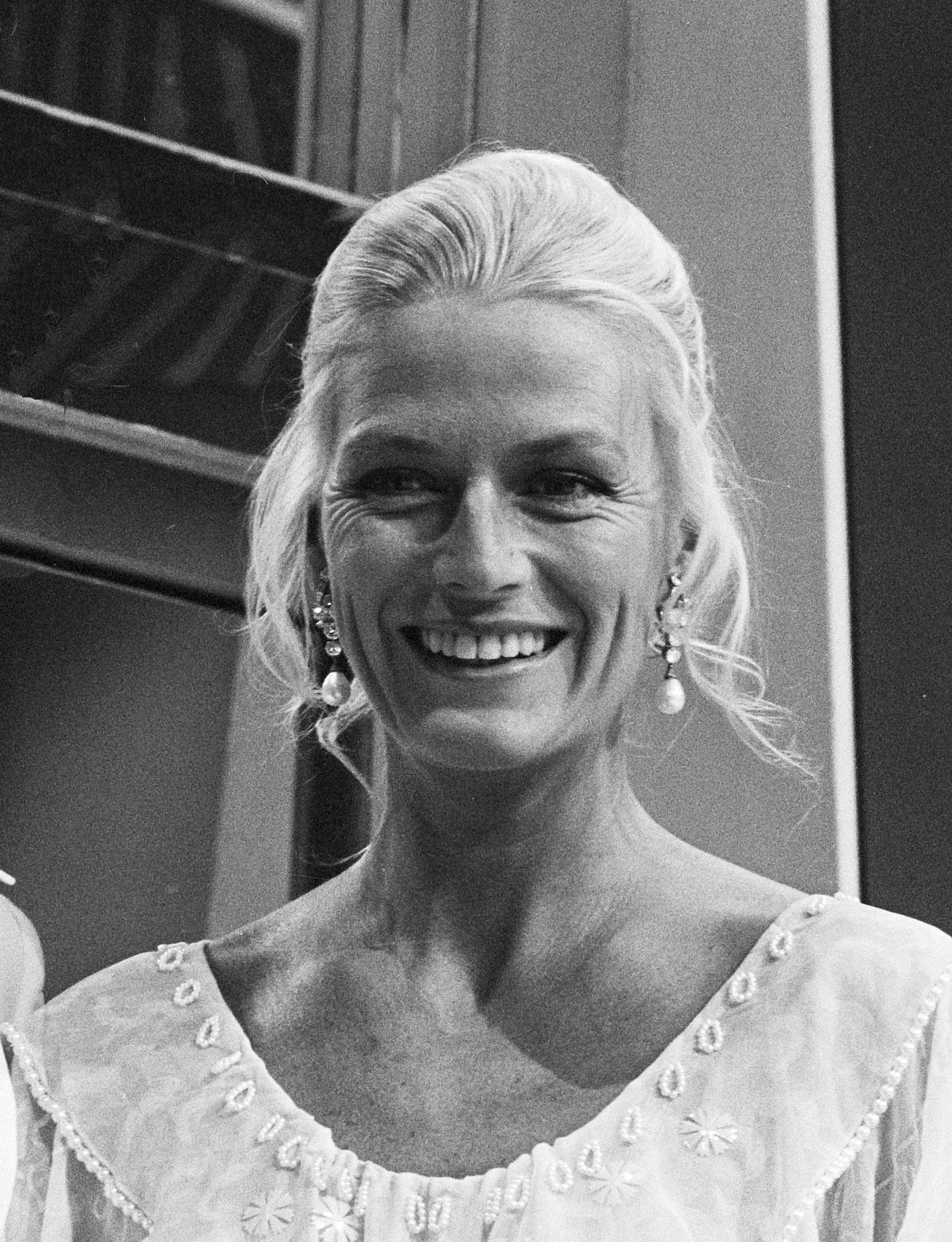
- Nina van Pallandt in 1979
- Born: Nina Magdelena Møller; 15 July 1932 (age 94); Østerbro, Denmark
- Occupations: Actress, singer
- Years active: 1958–1988
- Spouse(s): Hugo Wessel (m. 1955; div. 19??) Frederik van Pallandt (m. 1960; div. 1976) Robert Kirby (m. 197?; div. 197?)
- Children: 3

Nina, Baroness van Pallandt (born Nina Magdelena Møller; 15 July 1932)is a retired Danish singer and actress.

== Acting ==
Van Pallandt acted on television and in films. From 1969 to the early 1970s, she appeared as a guest on several episodes of the BBC comedy sketch series The Morecambe & Wise Show. In 1975, she appeared in the Ellery Queen episode "The Adventure of Colonel Nivin's Memoirs", and in 1988 she appeared in the Tales of the Unexpected episode "A Time to Die". In 1982, she appeared in the Taxi episode "Elegant Iggy".

Van Pallandt appeared in several Robert Altman films during the 1970s, including The Long Goodbye (1973), A Wedding (1978), and Quintet (1979). She notably played the Swedish madam of Richard Gere in American Gigolo (1980) and had a bedroom scene with Jeff Bridges in Cutter's Way (1981).

In 1969, van Pallandt sang John Barry and Hal David's song "Do You Know How Christmas Trees Are Grown?" in the James Bond movie On Her Majesty's Secret Service.

== Personal life ==
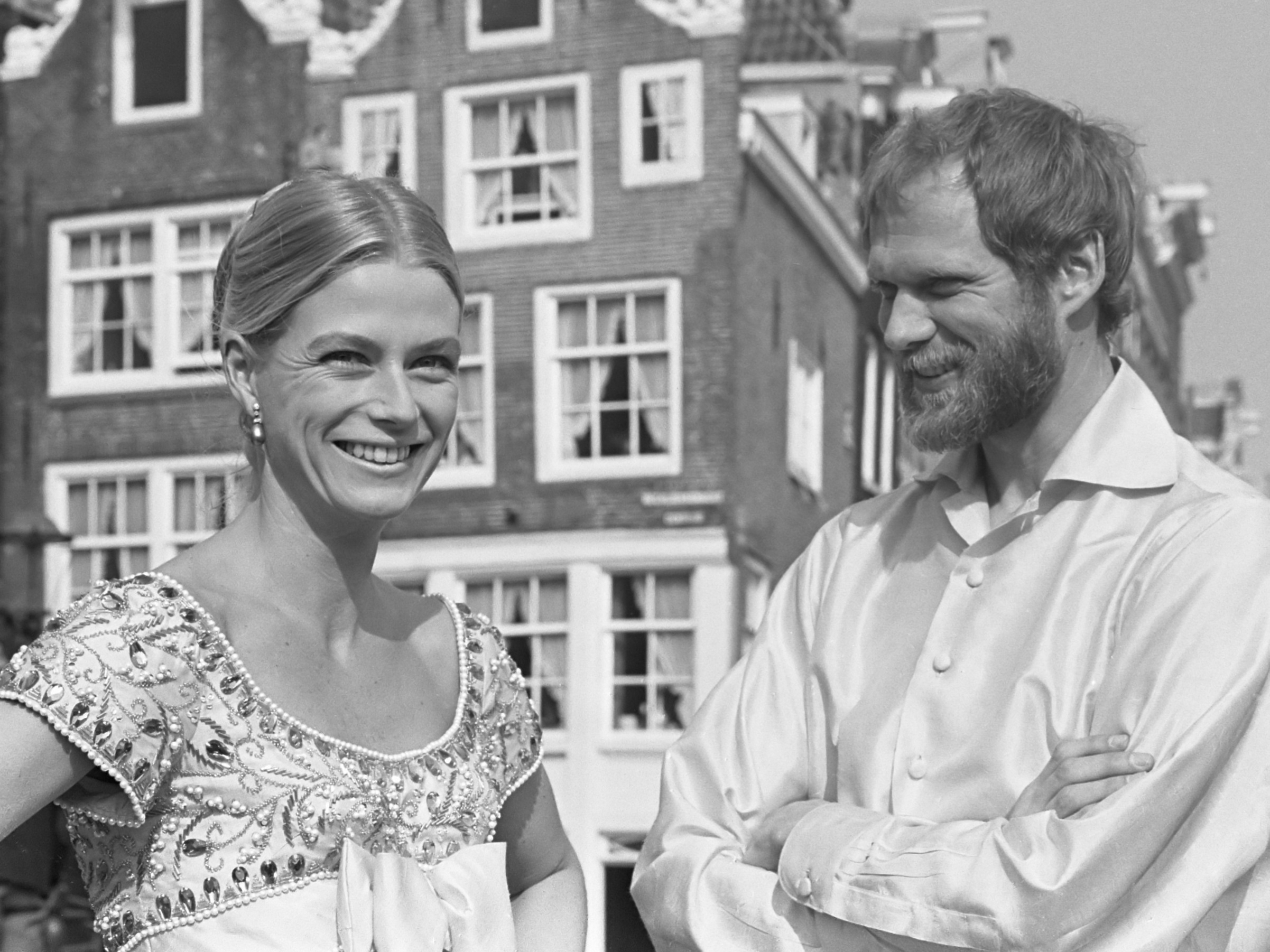
Nina and Frederik van Pallandt in Amsterdam (1967)

On 11 August 1955, she married Hugo Wessel, the son of English music hall singer Denise Orme and Danish diplomat Theodore W. "Tito" Wessel.

On 21 September 1960, she married Dutchman Frederik, Baron van Pallandt (born 1934). They formed a singing duo, Nina & Frederik, and achieved popularity, including top-40 hits in the United Kingdom, with their calypso-style songs. They had three children:

- Floris Nicolas Ali, Baron van Pallandt (1961–2006), a film writer, director and painter.
- Kirsa Eleonore Clara, Baroness van Pallandt (born 1963)
- Ana Maria Else, Baroness van Pallandt (born 1965)

The couple parted in 1969 and divorced in 1976.

In the early 1970s, van Pallandt was romantically linked to novelist and reporter Clifford Irving. She helped federal investigators prove that Irving had not secretly met Howard Hughes in South America. In the 2006 film The Hoax, about Irving's fake autobiography of Howard Hughes, van Pallandt is portrayed by Julie Delpy.

She was also married briefly to South African satirist Robert Kirby in the 1970s.
