= Tañon Strait =

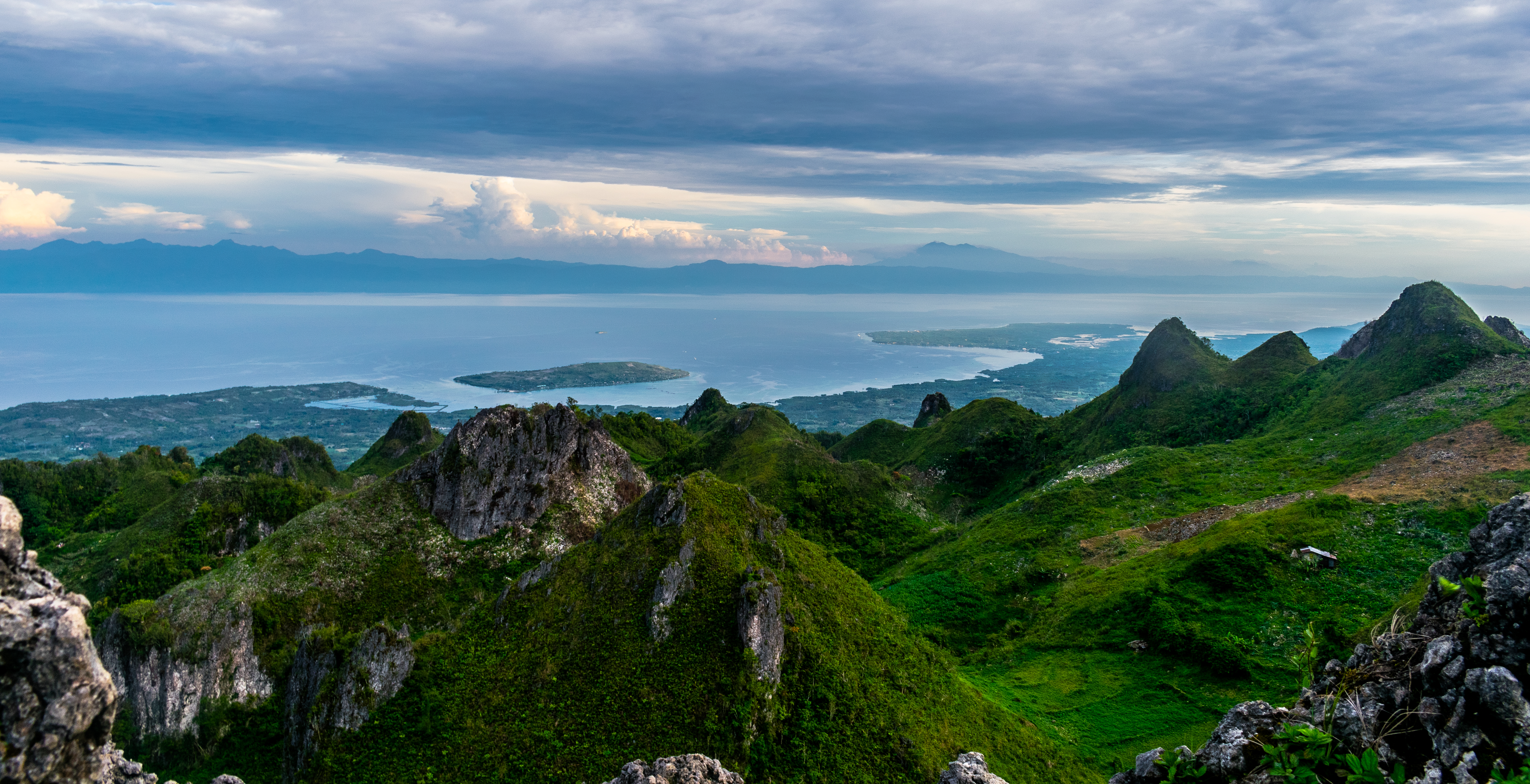
- Tañon Strait as seen from Osmeña Peak, Cebu

- Location within the Philippines Tañon Strait (Philippines)
- Location: Visayas
- Coordinates: 10°25′16″N 123°31′44″E
- Type: strait
- Managing agency: DENR
- Designation: Protected Seascape (1998)
- Max. length: 160 km (100 miles)
- Max. width: 27 km (17 miles)
- Max. depth: 500 m (1,600 feet)
- Shore length^{1}: 450 km (280 miles)
- ^{1} Shore length is not a well-defined measure.

The Tañon Strait (Filipino: Kipot ng Tañon) is a body of water, separating the islands of Negros and Cebu in the Visayas, Philippines. The strait, which is about 160 kilometres (100 mi) long, connects the Visayan Sea in the north to the Bohol Sea in the south. Its width varies from 5 to 27 kilometres (3 to 17 mi), with the narrowest point in the south. In the north the strait is closed off by the Don Islands, the largest of which is Bantayan. The cities of San Carlos, Negros Occidental, Bais, Negros Oriental and Toledo, Cebu have deepwater port facilities. The Tañon Strait is known for whale and dolphin watching, with tour boats operating from Bais.

== Protected area ==
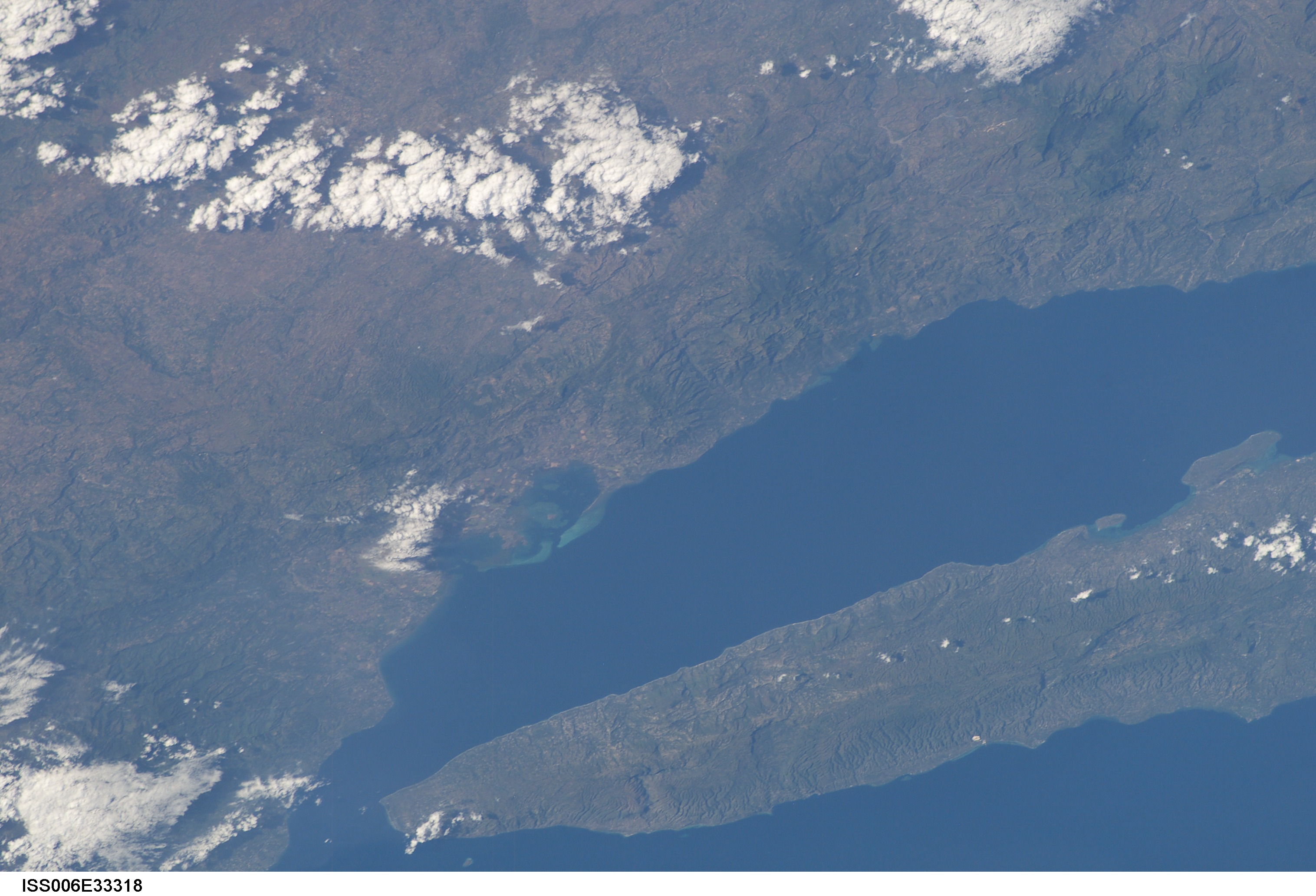
Satellite view of the strait taken during ISS Expedition 6

The Tañon Strait Protected Seascape (IUCN Management Category V) was established by President Ramos under Proclamation No. 1234 of 1998. With an area of more than 5,000 square kilometres (1,900 sq mi), it is the largest marine protected area in the Philippines. Taňon Strait was one of the seascape sites covered by the UNDP project Strengthening the Marine Protected Area System to Conserve Marine Key Biodiversity Areas (Smart Seas Philippines) (2014–2020), which listed Conservation International Philippines as a local partner.

== Controversy ==
On February 7, 2008, the Supreme Court of the Philippines ordered the Department of Environment and Natural Resources and the Department of Energy to comment on a certiorari petition filed for baleen and toothed whales, dolphins, porpoises including the Irrawaddy dolphins, and other cetacean species in the Tañon Strait to stop oil exploration by Japan Petroleum Exploration Co. Ltd. (JAPEX) in the protected waterway. The strait serves as a marine wildlife reserve that provides grounds for breeding, feeding and resting to 11 species of marine mammals. The court was asked to recognize the petitioners as "Filipino mammals" with constitutional rights.

JAPEX subsequently abandoned oil exploration in the area, saying that initial drilling had shown lack of commercial opportunity. However the Supreme Court case continued.

== Mythology ==
In Cebuano mythology, one of the three winged giant messengers of the Cebuano supreme god Kaptan was punished for stealing a unique sacred shell which can turn anybody into anything they please. The messenger, Sinogo, was a handsome man and the "favorite of Kaptan". Upon hearing of Sinogo's treachery, Kaptan ordered the others to pursue Sinogo. Sinogo fled west and eventually used the shell's power to turn himself into a giant crocodile (a sacred animal in old beliefs) so he could go deep in the straight "between two islands", modern-day Cebu and Negros. Kaptan, disappointed and angry, struck Sinogo with lightning, shocking the messenger giant and imprisoning him for all of eternity in modern-day Tanon Straight. Due to Kaptan's love for Sinogo, Kaptan decided to retain the sacred crocodile form of Sinogo despite his treachery. The stolen shell was dropped at sea when Sinogo was struck with lightning, but a sea creature managed to relocate it and bring it back to Kaptan. Ever since, if a whirlpool appears in the straight, people believe that Sinogo is trying to break from his eternal prison deep in the straight.

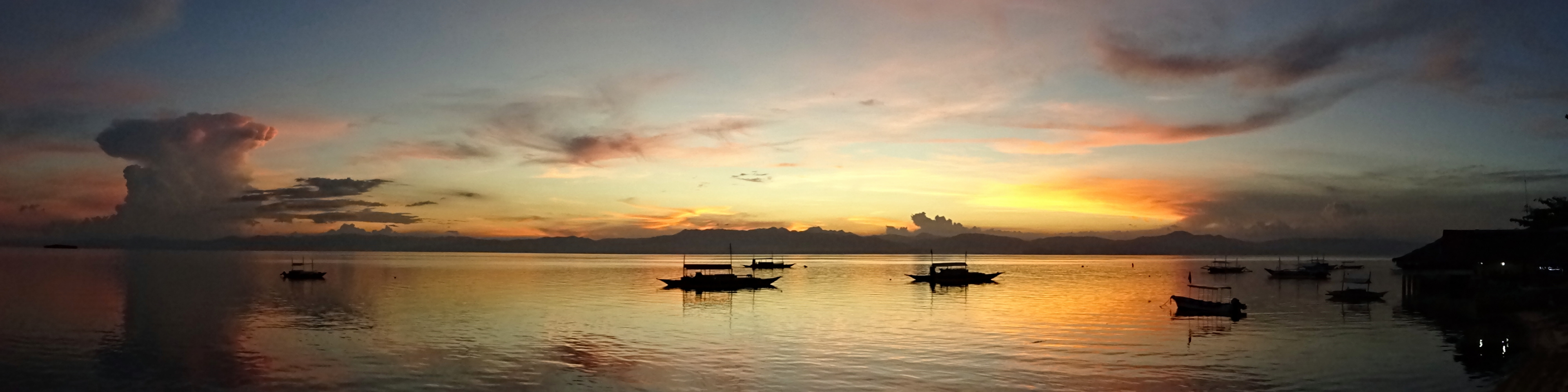
Tañon Strait as seen from Moalboal, Cebu
