= IJhorst =

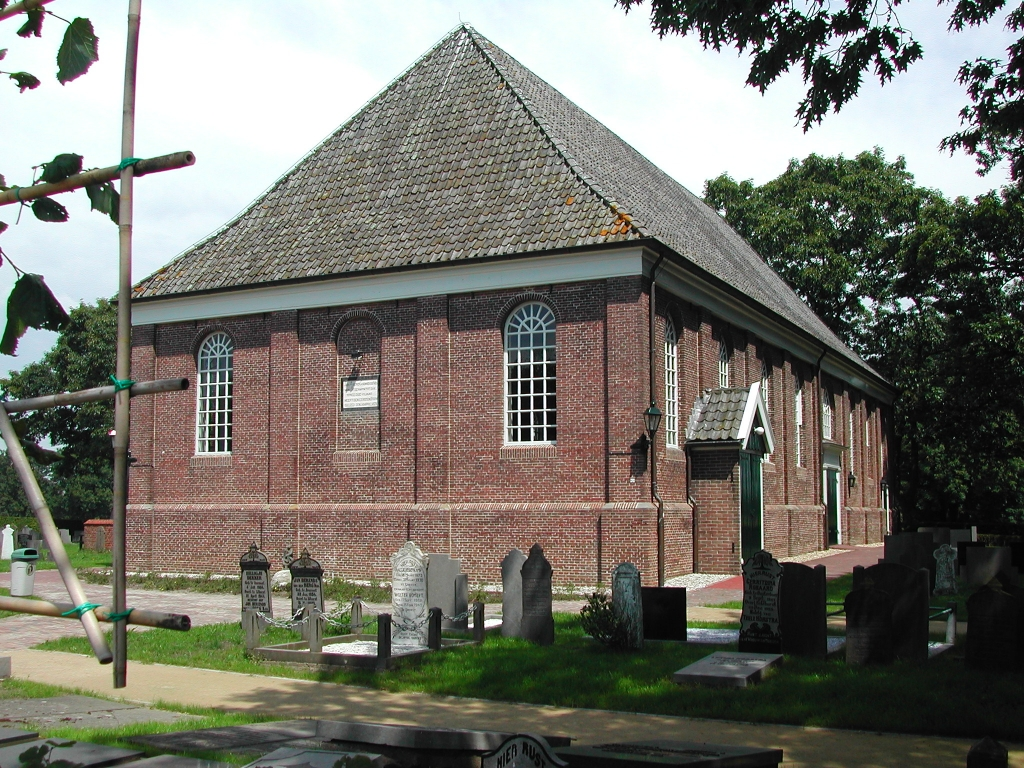
- Reformed church in IJhorst
- Interactive map of IJhorst
- Coordinates: 52°39′33″N 6°17′27″E
- Country: Netherlands
- Province: Overijssel
- Municipality: Staphorst

Population
  - Estimate (2026): 1,395

IJhorst is a village in the eastern Netherlands, within the municipality of Staphorst, Overijssel. The name IJhorst refers to an elevated spot in the landscape. As of 2026, its population is 1,395 of which 705 are men and 690 are women. The age distribution is: 0–15 years: 160, 15–25 years: 130, and 25–45 years: 75.

The village is a recreational center of Staphorst, popular for walking and biking through fields and forests. There are several campsites. Adjacent to the IJhorst Reformed church is a cemetery which includes the graves of six British airmen who died in World War II, and the graves of Baron Frederik van Pallandt and his son, the scriptwriter, Nicolas van Pallandt.

The Reest is a small creek that runs along IJhorst from the ice ages. In 2023 a 17 meter high watchtower was built on the banks of the Reest at IJhorst.
