= Robert Kirby (satirist) =

South African writer and comedian

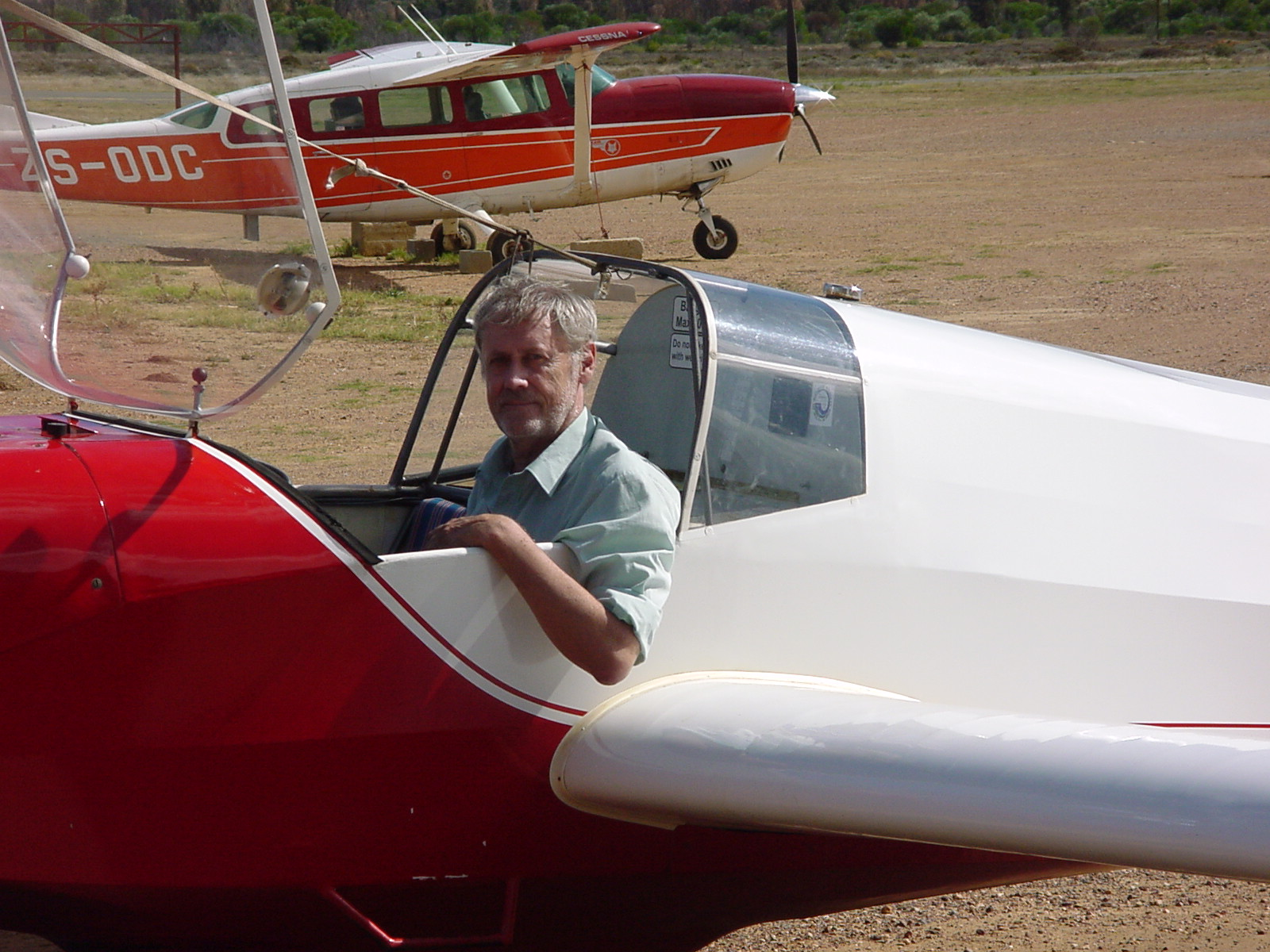
- Born: 26 April 1936; Durban, South Africa
- Died: 10 February 2007 (aged 70); Cape Town, South Africa
- Occupations: satirist, author, columnist, pilot, pianist
- Spouses: Barbara Craib (????-????); Nina Van Pallandt (????-????); Dulcie Truter (????-????)

Robert Kirby (26 April 1936 – 10 February 2007) was a South African satirist, playwright, comedian, novelist, columnist and musician who died in 2007 following complications from a heart operation, four months prior.

== Career ==
Kirby started his career in the early 1960s as a broadcaster at the SABC where he presented The Early Morning Programme. He became well known for his brand of satirical humour and his sharp wit—both of which were demonstrated in his later column in the South African newspaper, Mail & Guardian. Kirby is particularly remembered for his plays and reviews which were highly monitored due to his liberal attitude to apartheid.

Kirby also wrote specialist essays on fly fishing and on aviation, whilst putting in many hours flying for the Red Cross.

== Awards ==
Kirby was twice awarded the English Academy of Southern Africa’s Thomas Pringle Award for journalism, in 1996 and 2002, for his reviews and for an educational article respectively.

== Quotes ==
- "You can't have humour without offending somebody. Every joke offends somebody down the line. Humour that didn't plunge the knife into somebody's ribs would be terribly pale, vapid, weak."
- "I believe that we can do without censorship. I do not believe that censorship saves us from anarchy. It serves very little apart from itself. There has been no noticeable decline in pornography as a result of censorship."
- "I don't think much about the SABC - after all - they don't think that much about me ... But I do think their graphics on the news are marvellous. We're doing a thing on them in the show. You know what I mean. The hunger strikes are symbolised by a load of bread crossed out ... that sort of thing."

== Bibliography ==
Reviews

- Finger Trouble
- Finger Trouble 2
- Eight Beasts
- Eight Birds
- Heliotrope Bouquet
- Quodlibet
- Brave New Pretoria
- How Now Sacred Cow
- Separate Development

Plays

- Gentlemen
- It’s a Boy!
- Panics
- Weedkillers
- Wrong Time of Year
- The Bijers Sunbird
- The Secret Letters of Jan Van Riebeek

TV Sitcoms

- Louis Motors

Columns

- Channel Vision—The Star Tonight
- Loose Cannon—The Mail and Guardian
- The Agony Aunt—The Sunday Independent
- ???—The Financial Mail

Books

- Trebor Ybrik Versus the Rest
- It’s a Boy!
- The Secret Letters of Jan Van Riebeeck
- Rude Shelters
- Songs of the Cockroach
- Fly-Fishing in Southern Africa

== Sources ==
- M&G biography
- The Guardian
- Sunday Times
