= Verde Island Passage =

Strait in the Philippines

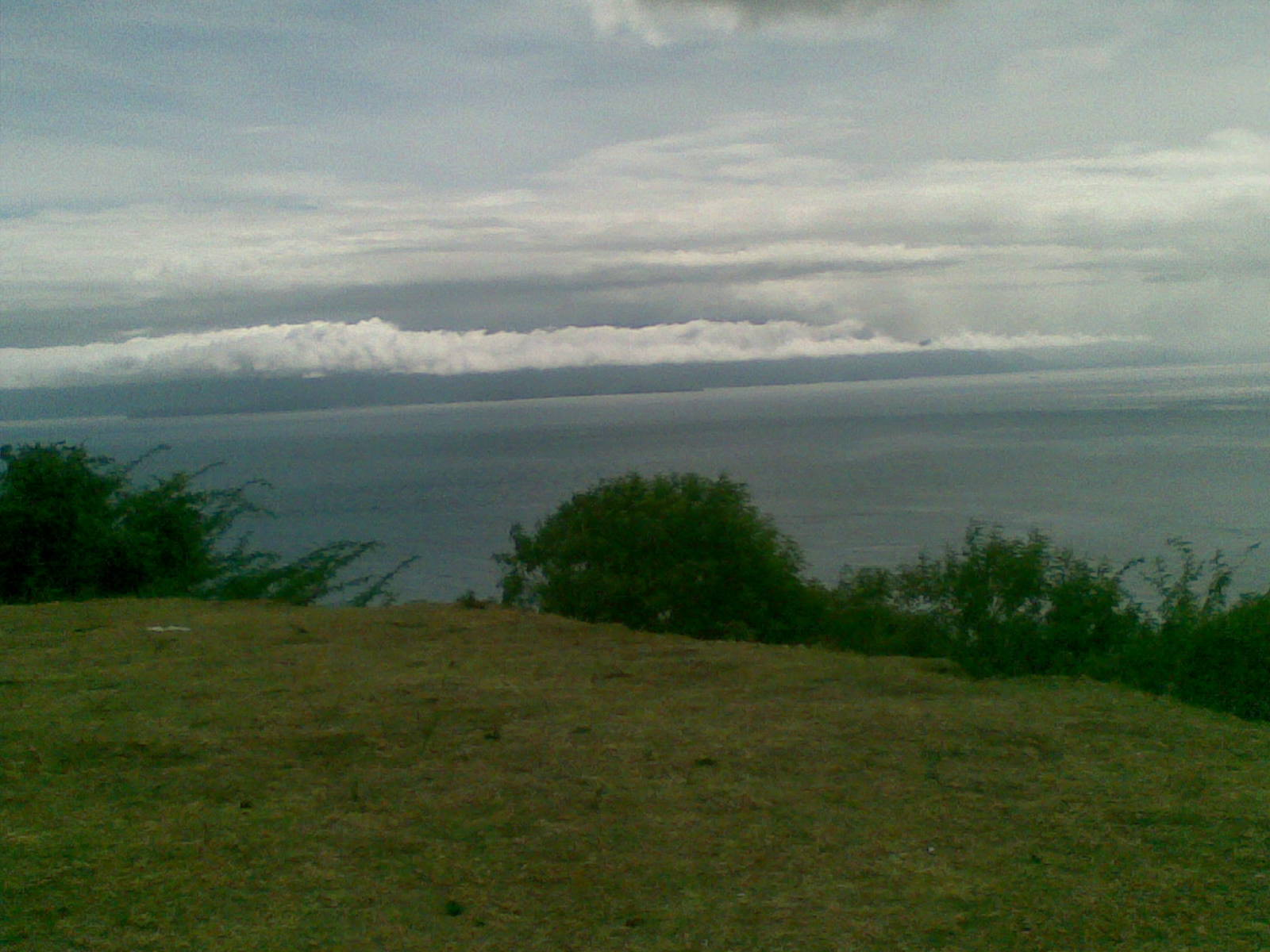
- The strait seen from Brgy. Pagkilatan in Batangas City

- Location within the Philippines Verde Island Passage (Philippines)
- Location: Mindoro; Luzon
- Coordinates: 13°34′31″N 120°52′3″E
- Type: strait
- Etymology: Verde Island

The Verde Island Passage is a strait that separates the islands of Luzon and Mindoro in the Philippines, connecting the South China Sea with the Tayabas Bay and the Sibuyan Sea beyond. Traditionally, the sea lane has been one of the busiest in the Philippines because it acts as a corridor from the Port of Manila to the Visayas and Mindanao in the south. A network of ferry routes cross the passage and connect the surrounding provinces of Batangas, Marinduque, Occidental Mindoro, Oriental Mindoro and Romblon. The Verde Island Passage is identified as one of the sites of highest marine biodiversity importance in the Coral Triangle. The 1.14 million hectare passage is extremely rich in marine biodiversity and has been called "Center of the Center of Marine Shorefish Biodiversity" with various conservation groups and local government units pushing for its nomination as a UNESCO World Heritage Site.

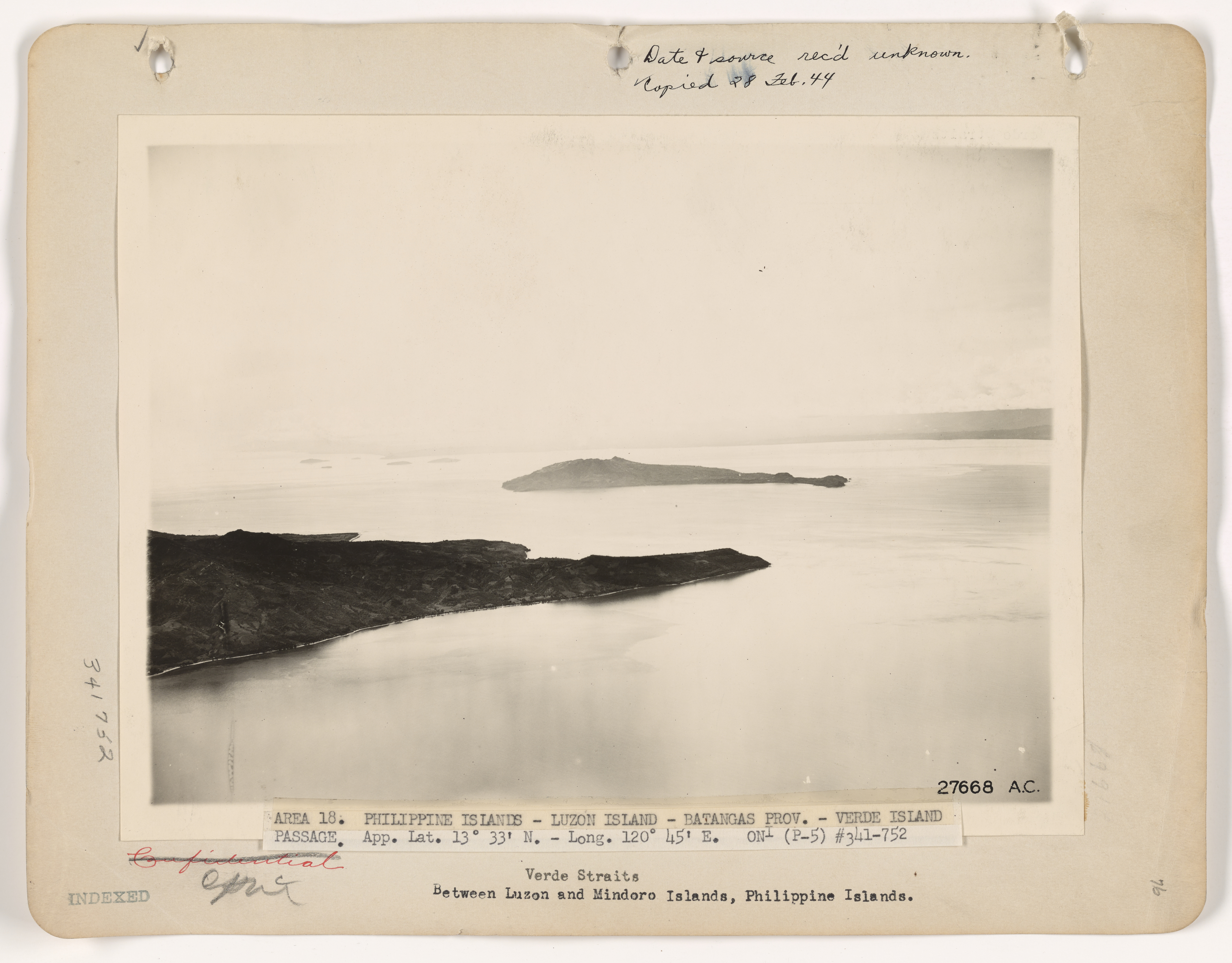
Aerial view of Verde Island Passage, date unknown

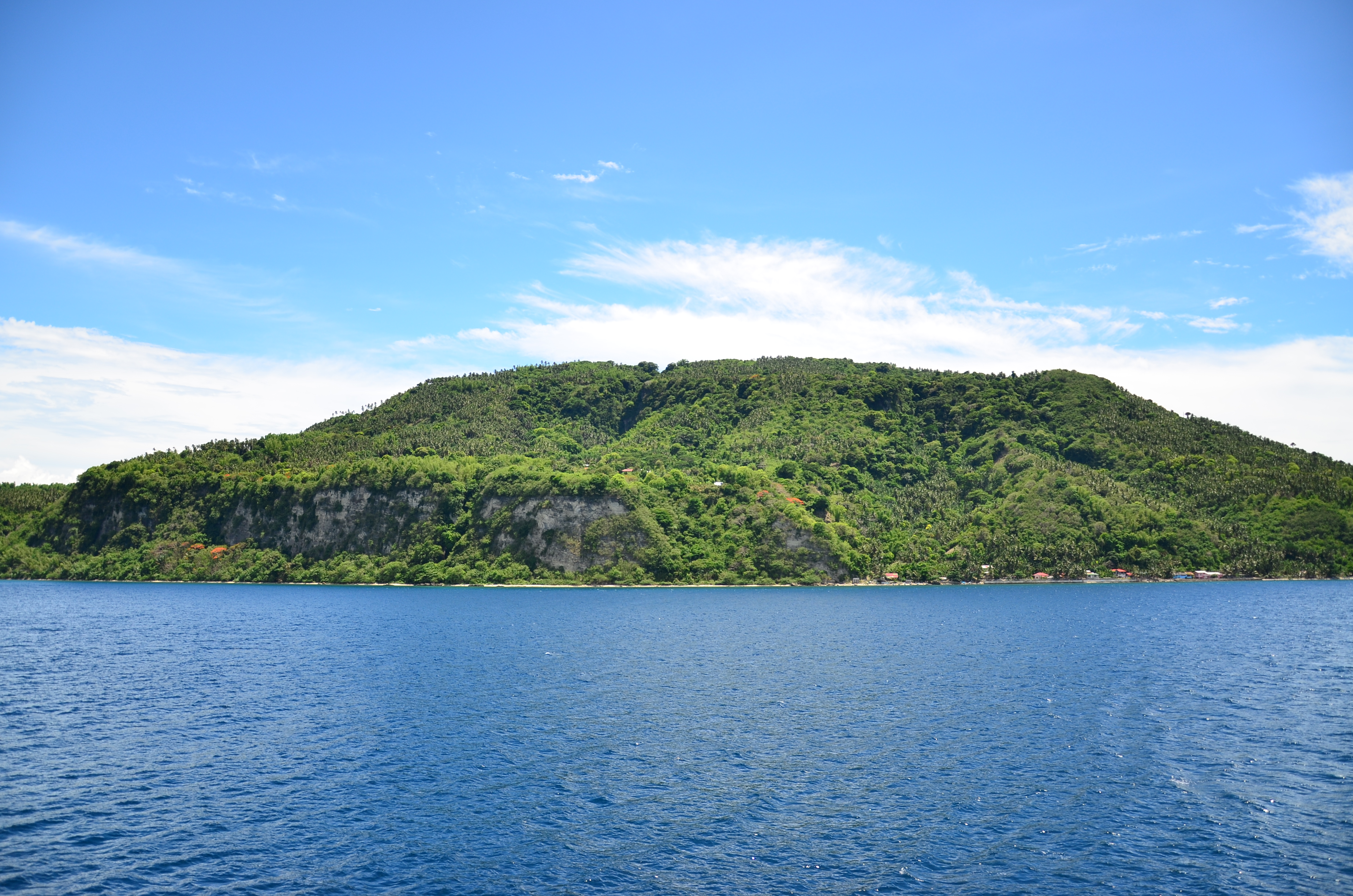
Isla Verde in the middle of the passage

== Center of the Center of Marine Shorefish Biodiversity ==
A team of marine conservationists declared in 2006 that the Philippines is the Center of Marine Biodiversity in the world and Verde Island Passage as the "Center of the Center of Marine Shorefish Biodiversity".

Many threatened species which include sea turtles like hawksbills, olive ridleys, and green turtles; humphead wrasses, giant groupers and giant clams are present in the Verde Island Passage. However, there are no enforcement of ordinances and over-fishing is common. A short-lived 'park fee' scheme for the Verde Island drop-off dive site was soon dropped when it was discovered that the revenue was being used to buy better fishing gear and hence removing fish at a higher rate. Several species such as the humphead wrasse have low catches frequently reporting 0 catches. It was particularly noted the rare red fin wrasse (Cirrhilabrus rubripinnis) thrives in Verde Island.

There is a complete moratorium of all types of fishing in the Batangas Bays and around Mindoro island. The fish sold in the markets of Puerto Galera comes from distance places such as Romblon.

== Role of Civil Society ==
Several Philippine NGOs and academic institutions focus on the Verde Island Passage. The Batangas Coastal Resources Management Foundation and environmental groups in Puerto Galera have long conducted education campaigns about sustainable fishing and diving practices. The Mindoro Biodiversity Conservation Foundation (MBCFI) engages communities on Mindoro in habitat restoration, wildlife monitoring, and livelihood projects that reduce dependence on resource extraction. In Batangas, the provincial government's Environment and Natural Resources Office works with local universities (like Batangas State University's VERDE Center) to undertake reef assessments and train citizen scientists. One notable effort is the citizen science program initiated by researchers from the California Academy of Sciences and De La Salle University, which trains local divers and volunteers to monitor coral reef health and upload data to a national biodiversity database. This initiative, supported by the USAID INSPIRE project and ABS-CBN Foundation, has empowered local stakeholders to take part in scientific monitoring and management of their reefs.

Internationally, the Verde Island Passage has attracted support from conservation networks. In 2023, the global marine nonprofit Mission Blue declared the passage a "Hope Spot", highlighting it as a special place critical to the health of the ocean and rallying international awareness for its protection. This designation was championed by marine scientists working in the region and celebrated by local communities. It has brought additional resources and attention, including collaborations with dive tourism operators and industry partners to promote conservation.

Private sector and social enterprises are also increasingly involved. Wovoka Philippines, a Filipina-led ecological restoration company, is working in Mindoro's upland communities to restore forests under its Project Arawatan. By replanting native trees in denuded watersheds, this project aims to improve water quality flowing into the Verde Island Passage and reduce sedimentation of coral reefs. At the same time, Wovoka partners with local organizations to develop sustainable livelihoods – from seedling nurseries to eco-tourism trails – that reinforce the value of keeping the forests and reefs healthy. Such nature-based initiatives, though led by a private entity, complement the efforts of NGOs and government by tackling environmental problems (like deforestation) at their source and by providing economic incentives for conservation.

== Government efforts ==
The unparalleled biodiversity of the Verde Island Passage has spurred numerous conservation initiatives from the mid-2000s onward. In 2006, Philippine President Gloria Macapagal-Arroyo issued Executive Order No. 578, which identified the Verde Island Passage Marine Corridor as a critical area for biodiversity and called for the development of a national policy to protect it. Since then, the passage has been a focus of both government and NGO-led programs. Local governments in all five surrounding provinces have established marine protected areas (MPAs) and fishery management zones along their coasts to safeguard key reefs and fish spawning grounds. By 2017, there were at least 36 community-managed MPAs within the passage (24 in Batangas and 12 in Oriental Mindoro), many organized into networks for collaborative management. These MPAs range from small no-take fish sanctuaries to larger marine parks, and collectively they help conserve habitats while allowing depleted fish populations to recover.

Cooperation across provincial boundaries has been crucial, given the interconnected nature of the marine ecosystem. In April 2017, the governors of Batangas, Marinduque, Romblon, Oriental Mindoro, and Occidental Mindoro – together with national agencies such as the Department of Environment and Natural Resources (DENR), Bureau of Fisheries and Aquatic Resources, the Philippine Coast Guard, and Philippine National Police – signed a landmark agreement to strengthen protection of the entire passage. This Memorandum of Agreement established the Verde Island Passage Marine Protected Area Network (VIP MPAN) and a coordinated law enforcement network, enabling joint patrols and unified management policies across the region. The network approach aims to ensure that marine biodiversity is conserved beyond jurisdictional boundaries, creating ecological connectivity between MPAs and improving compliance with fishery and environmental regulations.

== Conservation alarms ==
The other main contributor to sustained marine diversity is the damage caused by commercial vessels and other ferries using the passage on a daily basis. It is common that commercial vehicles discharge various pollutants into the waters on which the municipalities and other local bodies have no control. In stormy times, large vehicles are seen anchoring to the corals in the area causing damage to them. The conservation message has to be put cross to major commercial shipping lines and the crews need to be educated on the diversity of the Verde Passage and the dire need for its protection. There are other major issues that affect the sustainability of the Verde Passage. The heavy use of agro-chemicals (pesticides and chemical fertilizer) in the up-stream of Batangas River and the resultant wash off down the river and finally into the Batangas Bay is a serious issue that warrants attention. The discharge of urban waste and grey water in Puerto Galera and other urban areas into the numerous bays around the passage is yet another major issue. The treatment of grey water and septic effluent is not practiced which is a huge concern. The growing tourism aggravates this problem.

The area has more than 300 species of corals, which is considered one of the largest concentrations of corals in the country, or possibly, the whole world. Coral health is generally good, though the effects of global warming and increased pollution, may still lead to a drop in diversity. The Verde Island passage is located next to Batangas Bay which is rapidly becoming a major refining and petrol chemical center in the Philippines. Until now, no infrastructure is in place to contain a major oil, or chemical spill.

=== Information and awareness ===
The Passage is recognised for its marine diversity with an awareness for the need to protect the strait from over fishing through conservation programs and talks from academics. Marine parks and ocean guards have also been created to increase the conservation of wildlife. Although, academics have made calls for more to be done to protect the Verde Island Passage while still supporting the local population. Research on scaling up marine protected area networks in the Verde Island Passage used third-party data obtained from Conservation International Philippines.

== Diving ==
Verde Island, located right in the center of the strait, is a popular diving location in the Philippines due to its clear waters and renowned biodiverse marine life. Daily trips for scuba divers are made from Puerto Galera.

Sustainable tourism is increasingly seen as both a goal and a tool for conservation. The area is famous among scuba divers and snorkelers worldwide; sites like the Verde Island drop-off (a coral wall near Verde Island), the reefs of Puerto Galera in Oriental Mindoro, and the diving spots of Anilao in Batangas attract thousands of visitors each year. Tourism provides significant income and employment in coastal communities – Puerto Galera, for example, has developed a dive resort industry that supports many local families. Recognizing the economic value of a healthy marine environment, local governments and businesses have pursued strategies to make tourism more sustainable and reef-friendly.

The wreckage of a Spanish galleon that sunk in 1620 is located in the South of the passage. Most of the ship's cargo was salvaged from the wreckage between 1970 and 1990. Today, nothing remains of the wreck except for a few shards of porcelain and some larger pieces of terracotta jars. The keel was removed and is now located in Puerto Galera for conservation. However, some timbers from the keel remained and were left to rot at a depth of 6 meters in front of Sabang Beach.

Sustainable tourism in the Verde Island Passage remains a work in progress. On one hand, tourism has incentivized conservation: the prospect of long-term tourism income has led local stakeholders to support stricter protections on destructive activities like dynamite fishing and coral mining. On the other hand, unregulated or mass tourism can put pressure on the environment. In peak seasons, popular beaches and dive spots can become crowded, and without proper waste management, pollution can increase. There have been instances of coral damage from inexperienced divers or careless boating. To address these issues, multi-sector committees (involving tour operators, local officials, and NGOs) have been set up in areas like Puerto Galera and Mabini to monitor environmental impacts and enforce regulations. The goal is to balance access and protection: allowing people to enjoy the passage's natural beauty while ensuring that reefs, beaches, and marine wildlife remain healthy for future generations.

== See also ==
- Apo Reef
- Tubbataha Reef
