= Puerto Galera =

Municipality in Oriental Mindoro, Philippines

- Municipality
- Municipality of Puerto Galera
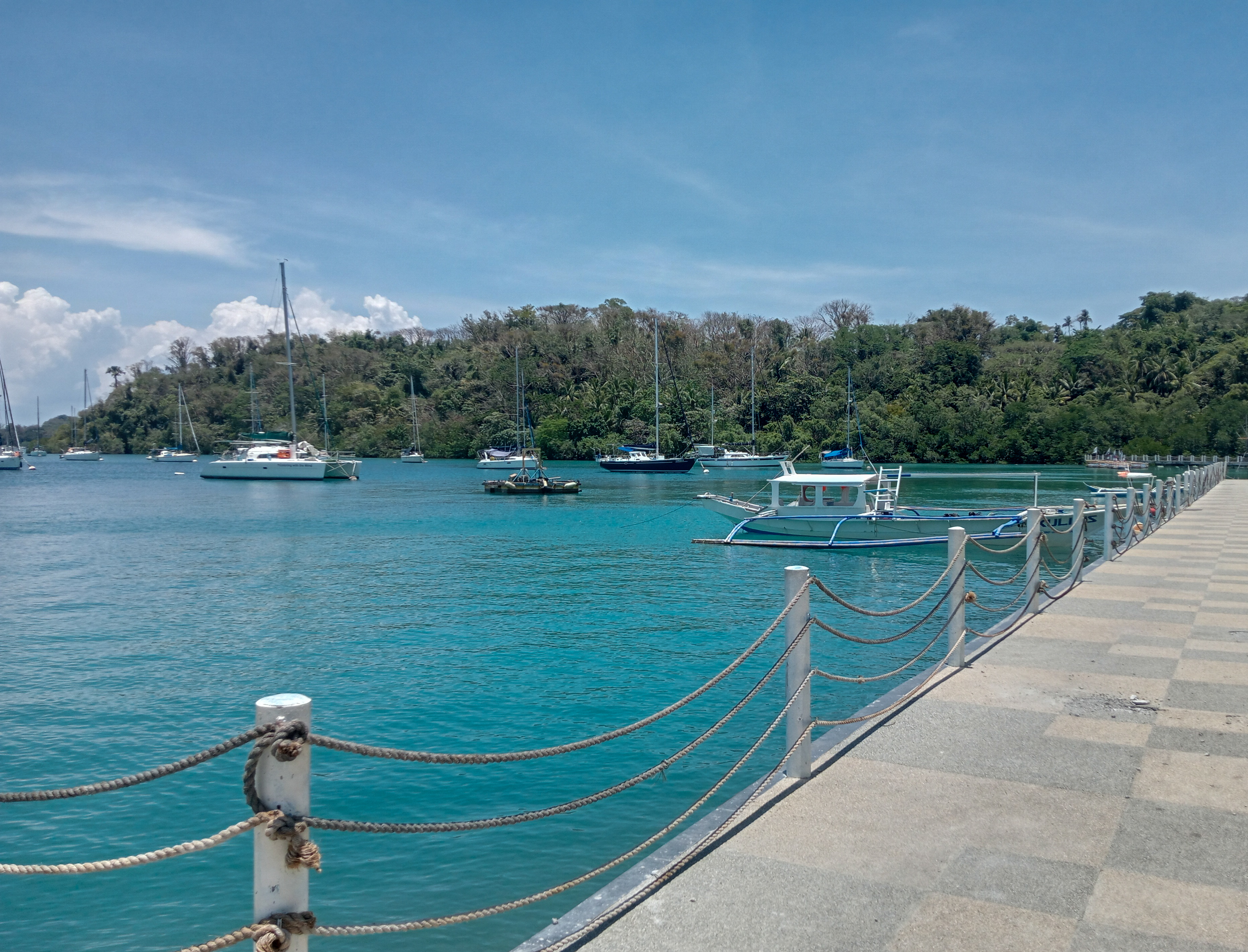
- Muelle Port

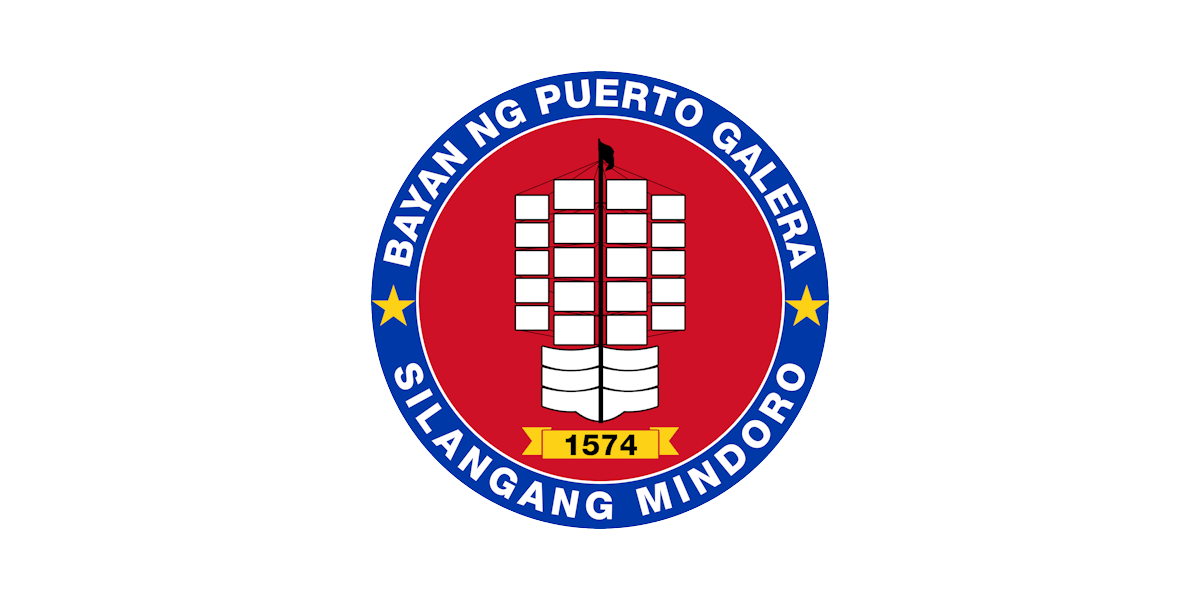
- Flag Seal
- Motto: The Amazing Puerto Galera
- Anthem: The Amazing Puerto Galera
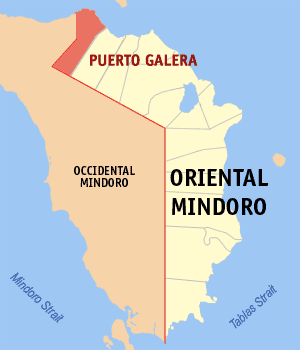
- Map of Oriental Mindoro with Puerto Galera highlighted
- Interactive map of Puerto Galera
- Location within the Philippines
- Coordinates: 13°30′00″N 120°57′15″E
- Country: Philippines
- Region: Mimaropa
- Province: Oriental Mindoro
- District: 1st district
- Founded: 1574
- Barangays: 13 (see Barangays)

Government
  - Type: Sangguniang Bayan
  - Mayor: Robinhood Ylagan
  - Vice Mayor: Rocky Ilagan
  - Councilor: Aris Atienza
  - Electorate: 27,024 voters (2025)

Area
  - Total: 247.85 km^{2} (95.70 sq mi)
- Elevation: 429 m (1,407 ft)
- Highest elevation: 2,571 m (8,435 ft)
- Lowest elevation: 0 m (0 ft)

Population (2024 census)
  - Total: 42,301
  - Density: 170.67/km^{2} (442.04/sq mi)
  - Households: 9,944

Economy
  - Income class: 1st municipal income class
  - Poverty incidence: 9.36% (2023)
  - Revenue: ₱ 450.5 million (2024)
  - Assets: ₱ 1,032 million (2024)
  - Expenditure: ₱ 42.39 million (2024)
  - Liabilities: ₱ 356.8 million (2024)

Service provider
  - Electricity: Oriental Mindoro Electric Cooperative (ORMECO)
- Time zone: UTC+8 (PST)
- ZIP code: 5203
- PSGC: 1705211000
- IDD : area code: +63 (0)43
- Native languages: Iraya; Tagalog
- Website: www.puertogalera.gov.ph

Puerto Galera, officially the Municipality of Puerto Galera (Filipino: Bayan ng Puerto Galera), is a municipality in the province of Oriental Mindoro, Philippines. According to the 2024 census, it has a population of 42,301 people.

It is dubbed as the pearl of Mindoro, the town is known for its sand beaches, crystal clear blue waters, diving sites and the location of Muelle Bay, a UNESCO-protected area.

== History ==
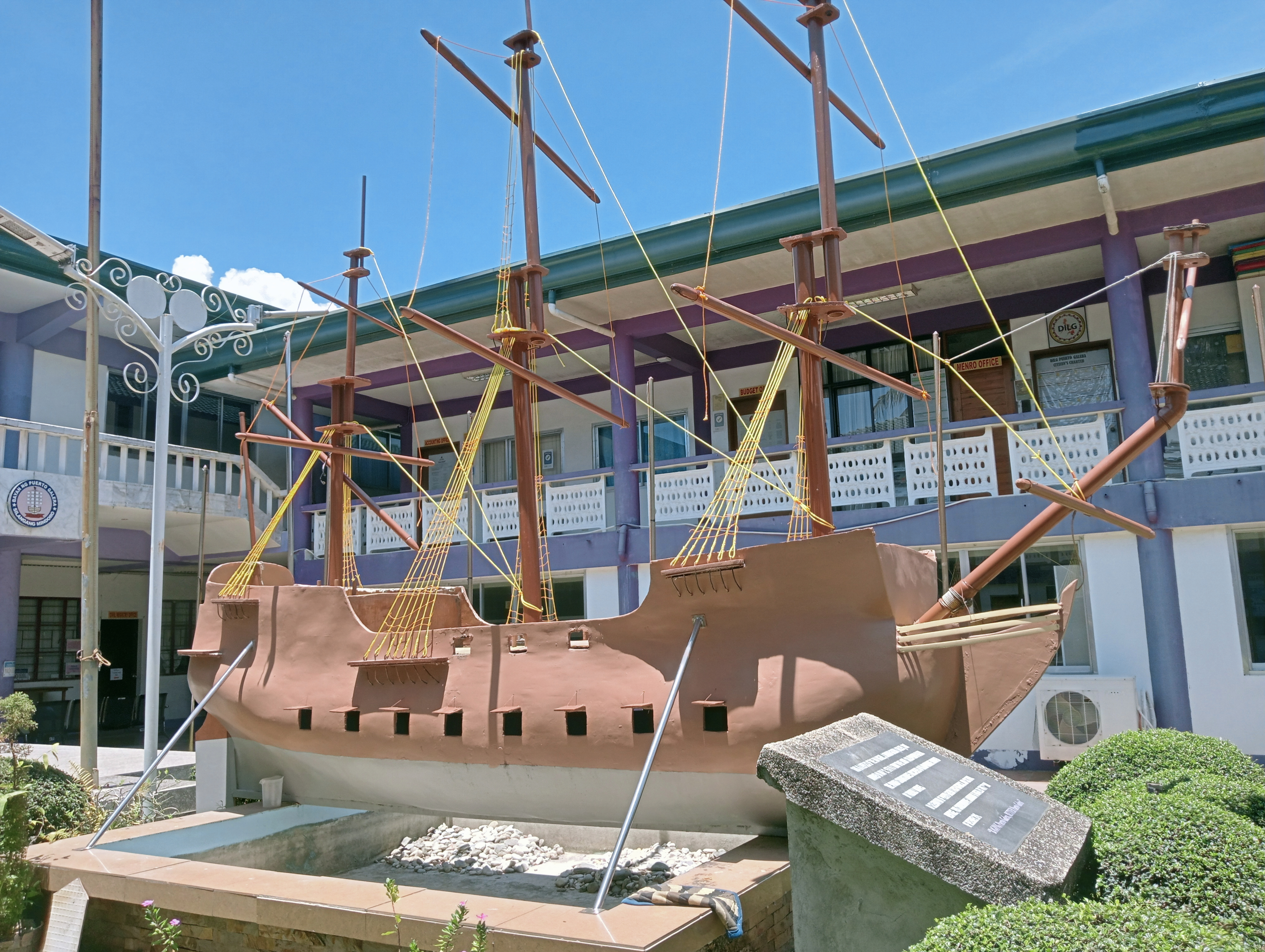
San Miguel (Spanish galera) replica at the Municipal Hall

Chinese traders possibly knew the place before the arrival of the Spaniards but there is no evidence of Chinese settlement. The place was likely also known by other Southeast Asian merchants, who would have found it convenient to load and unload goods. The bay was a convenient place to shelter ships against bad weather, and a warehouse was built at Muelle to store supplies and trade black rice.

In April 1570, the Spaniards arrived in Bombon (now known as Batangas), and later sailed through the Verde Island Passage, and landed in a place they named Puerto Galera (the port of Galleons). Miguel López de Legazpi became the first Spanish governor-general of the island. A garrison for soldiers was built in Muelle, and watchtowers were erected in Dampalitan Point to monitor activity in the bay. The Spanish gave chase to the Moro pirates, who were disrupting their trade with the Chinese and natives. The latter proved to be not only skilled warriors but also good negotiators, even in the face of defeat.

In 1663, a change in the form of administration occurred in the island. The corregidor was replaced by the alcalde-mayor or provincial governor, and the capital was moved from Puerto Galera to Baco. In the seventeenth century, the relative prosperity of the city underwent a serious setback with the rise of Moro piracy. Both pirate attacks and Spanish mismanagement resulted in driving the native population either into exile in safer places or sending them inland to comparative safety.

== Geography ==
Puerto Galera is located at the north-westernmost part of Oriental Mindoro, and at the south-western end of the Isla Verde Passage, about 130 kilometres (81 mi) south of Manila and 51 kilometres (32 mi) from Calapan, the provincial capital.

It is mainly accessible through the Balatero Port, from the Southern Luzon gateway Port of Batangas by bamboo boats (bangka) operated by local regular operators, as well as the bigger Montenegro Shipping Lines, Inc. (MSLI) that also operates the route with a once a day RoRo service in addition to at least twice a day fastcraft ones.Higher-end beach resorts could take their customers directly to by their spot such as those located in Sabang, bypassing Balatero (which is around a 10-km drive away through mostly mountainous/hilly terrain). The government in the late 2010s or early 2020s, had the [regular] passenger services of these consolidated at the aforementioned Philippine Ports Authority-managed port. Formerly, the separate locations of White Beach, Balatero, Muelle and Sabang all offered transport services to Batangas/Luzon island. Muelle port has since been turned into a heritage park/plaza.

=== Barangays ===
Puerto Galera is politically subdivided into 13 barangays. Each barangay consists of puroks and some have sitios.

- Aninuan
- Baclayan
- Balatero
- Dulangan
- Palangan
- Poblacion
- Sabang
- San Antonio
- San Isidro
- Santo Niño
- Sinandigan
- Tabinay
- Villaflor

=== Climate ===
Climate data for Puerto Galera, Oriental Mindoro
Month	Jan	Feb	Mar	Apr	May	Jun	Jul	Aug	Sep	Oct	Nov	Dec	Year
Mean daily maximum °C (°F)	28 (82)	29 (84)	30 (86)	31 (88)	31 (88)	30 (86)	29 (84)	29 (84)	29 (84)	29 (84)	29 (84)	28 (82)	29 (85)
Mean daily minimum °C (°F)	22 (72)	21 (70)	22 (72)	23 (73)	25 (77)	25 (77)	25 (77)	25 (77)	25 (77)	24 (75)	23 (73)	22 (72)	24 (74)
Average precipitation mm (inches)	48 (1.9)	32 (1.3)	41 (1.6)	54 (2.1)	257 (10.1)	410 (16.1)	466 (18.3)	422 (16.6)	429 (16.9)	300 (11.8)	137 (5.4)	92 (3.6)	2,688 (105.7)
Average rainy days	10.8	8.0	9.8	11.7	23.1	27.5	29.2	28.7	28.7	25.5	18.2	12.8	234
Source: Meteoblue (modeled/calculated data, not measured locally)

== Demographics ==
Population census of Puerto Galera

Year	Pop.	±% p.a.
1903	1,275	—
1939	3,433	+2.79%
1948	3,948	+1.57%
1960	5,925	+3.44%
1970	7,659	+2.60%
1975	10,129	+5.77%
1980	12,306	+3.97%
1990	17,200	+3.41%

Year	Pop.	±% p.a.
1995	19,485	+2.36%
2000	21,925	+2.56%
2007	28,035	+3.45%
2010	32,521	+5.55%
2015	36,606	+2.28%
2020	41,961	+2.92%
2024	42,301	+0.19%

Source: Philippine Statistics Authority

The Philippine Statistics Authority characterizes the municipality of Puerto Galera as first class based on household income. The municipality had a population of 42,301 people in the 2024 national census.

== Economy ==
Poverty incidence of Puerto Galera (%)

Source: Philippine Statistics Authority

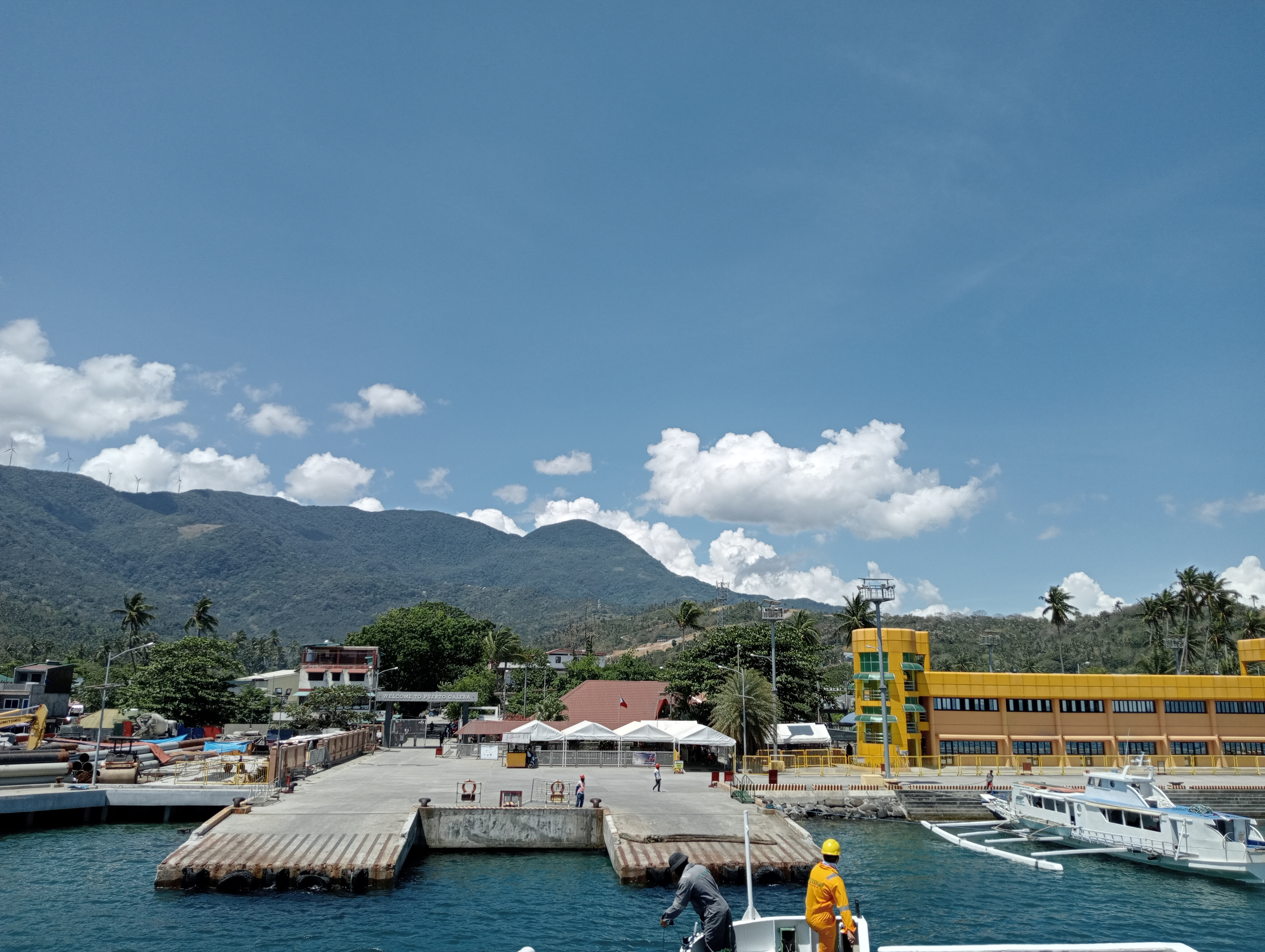
Port of Puerto Galera

The traditional economy of the city used to be fishing and subsistence agriculture, but with the boom of tourism at the end of the 1970s, the service sector became more and more important and led to population and economic growth. Of the 13 villages ("barangays") in Puerto Galera, half now rely on tourism-based activities for sustenance.

In addition, Mindoro is quickly becoming one of the key places in the development of renewable energy in the Philippines. With several large wind, hydroelectric, and geothermal projects under construction, the island hoped in 2012 to be a net exporter of electricity by 2016.

=== Tourism ===
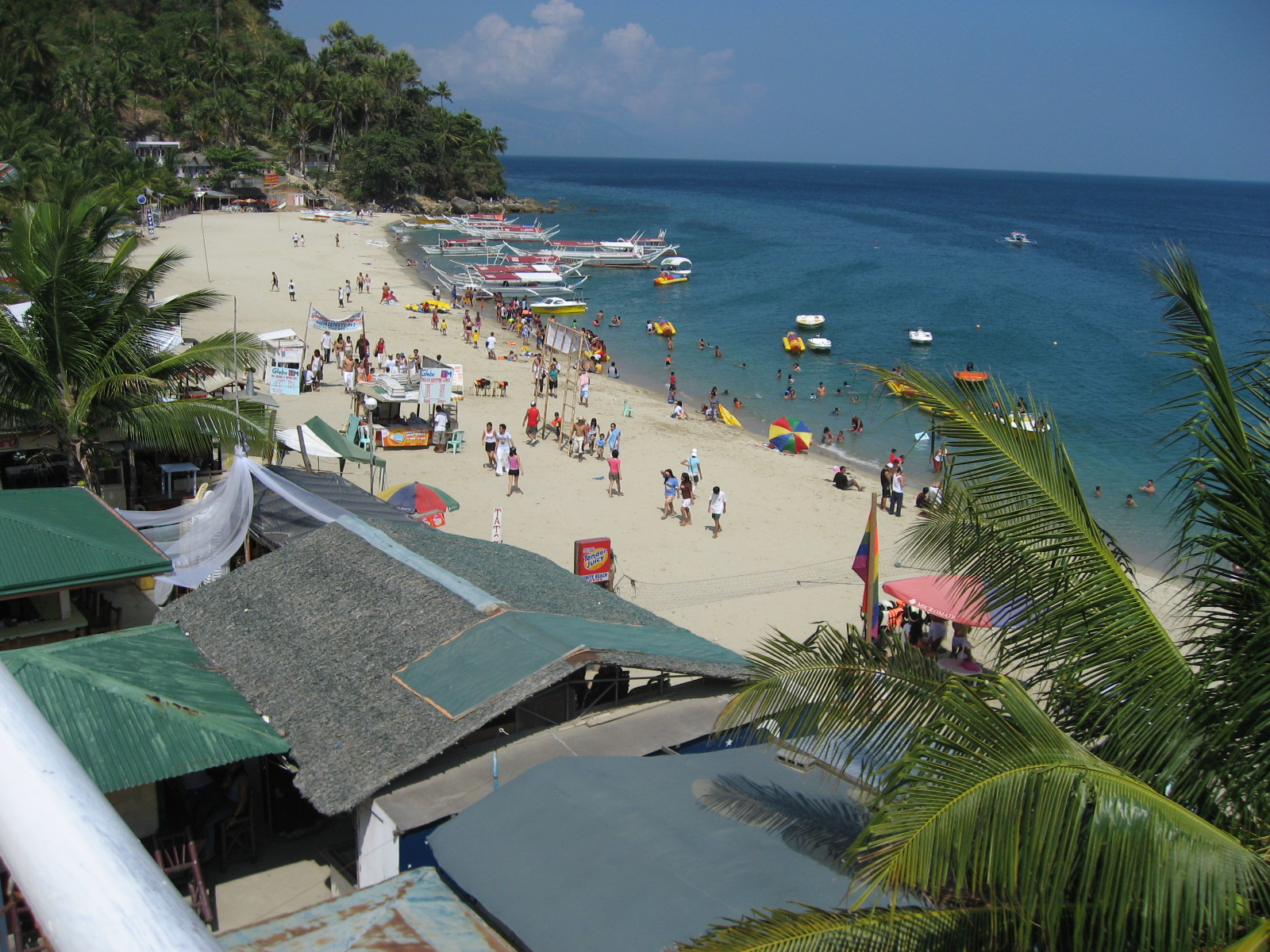
White Beach

Tourism now represents the core activity of the economy of Puerto Galera, which is well known for its beaches, scuba diving and entertainment activities, including "go-go bars". The city and its beaches have also become one of the many sites of the Philippines sex tourism industry.

This coastal town has a number of pocket beaches and snorkeling and scuba diving spots. The area was designated a Man and Biosphere reserve of UNESCO in 1973 and has some of the most diverse coral reef diving in Asia. Since 2001, the marine environment has benefited from a huge reduction in the number of fishermen in the area, as they gain higher revenue from tourism activities.

Puerto Galera is included in the list of the "Club of the Most Beautiful Bays of the World", and is the only bay in the Philippines to be found on this list.

Among the beaches in Puerto Galera are Sabang Beach and White Beach, which have an active nightlife with numerous bars and restaurants. Both places are directly accessible from Batangas by bangka regular lines. On the west, where is only a local boat connection to Abra de Ilog, the planned road between the two cities has not been completed yet. On the east, the city connects by road to Calapan through the Mindoro circular road.

== Tourism ==
=== Diving and snorkeling ===
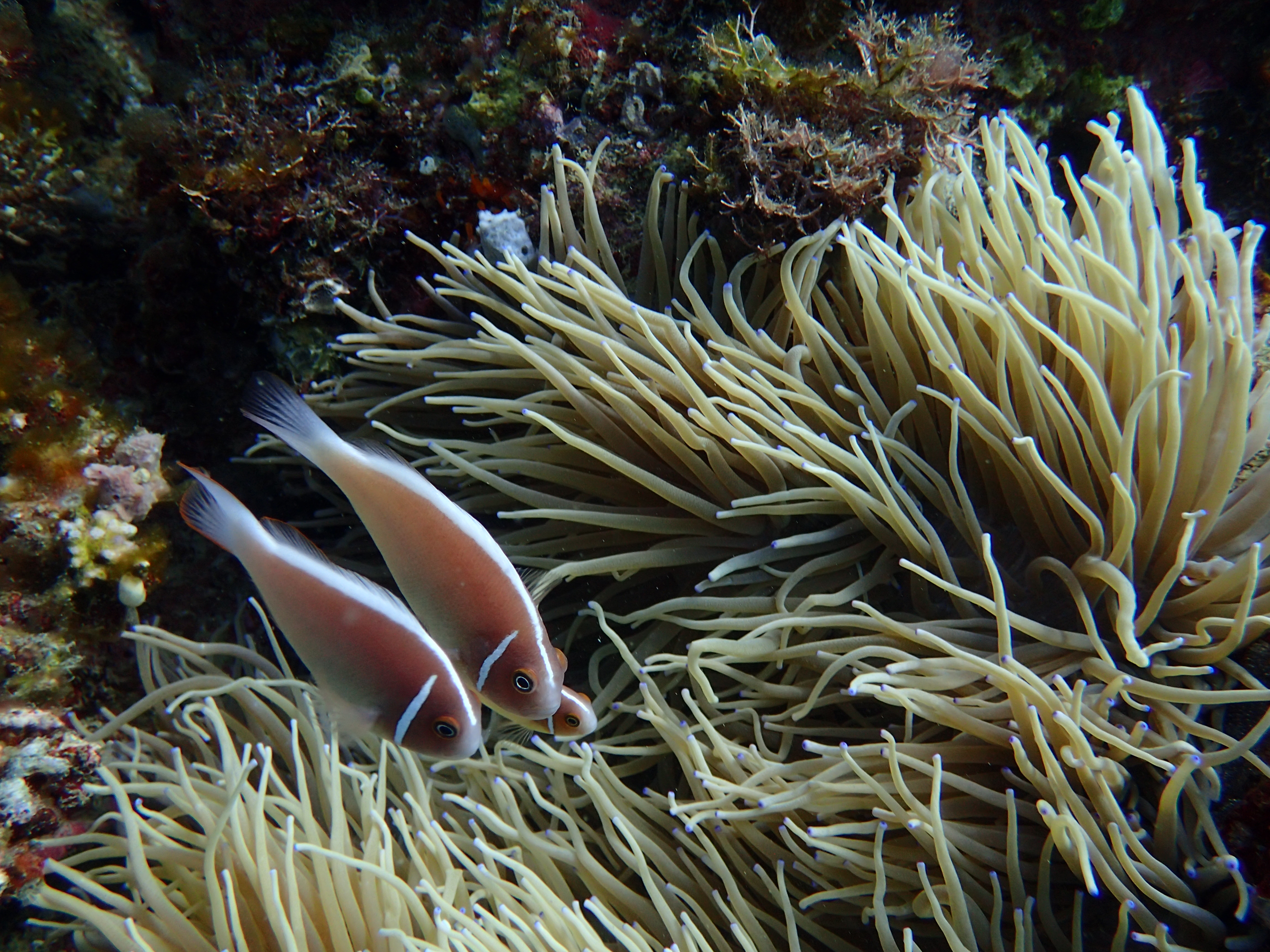
Puerto Galera underwater view

Puerto Galera, especially the Sabang area, is among the top diving destinations in the Philippines and in Asia. Diving sites are found less than five minutes from Sabang Beach. Diving activities generally focus around the areas either side of Escarceo Point. Marine life is diverse. There are over 180+ species of nudibranchs found in the area, and many species of fish can be seen. A variety of wrecks over the years can be found in addition to the one wreck of an engine of a WWII Japanese patrol boat. The major diving federations PADI, CMAS, NAUI and Technical Diving International (TDI) are represented in the area, offering courses from beginners' open water to advanced and technical diving (rebreather, trimix). Diving trips in the Verde Island Passage, at the heart of the Coral Triangle are organized from Puerto Galera. Many threatened species such as a variety of sea turtles including hawksbills, olive ridleys, and green turtles, humphead wrasses, giant groupers and giant clams are present in the Verde Island Passage.

=== Sailing ===
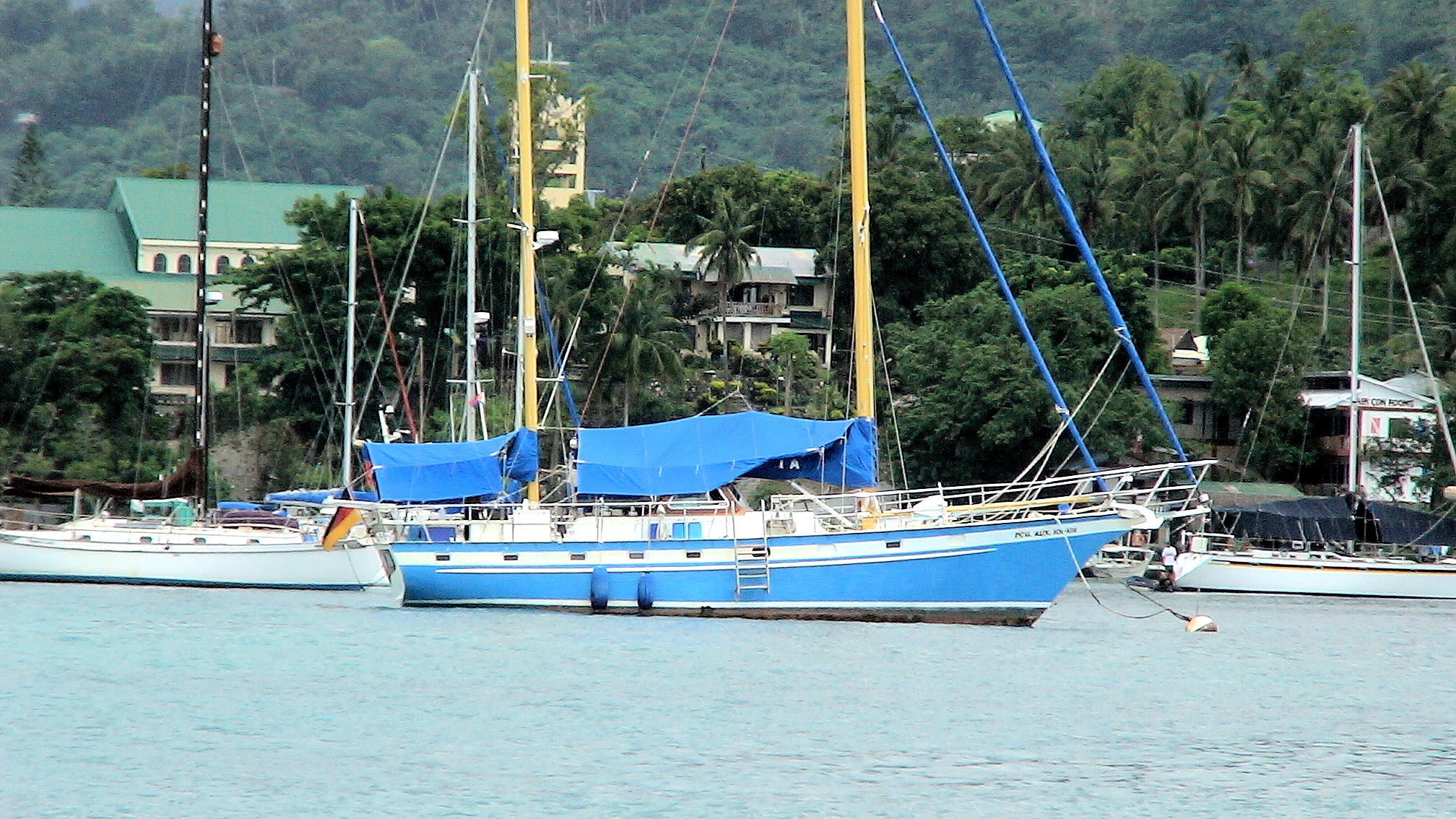
Yachts moored offshore PGYC.

Puerto Galera is known as a sailing destination in Mindoro, with Puerto Galera Bay providing a natural harbor that offers shelter for yachts and sailboats during the typhoon season. The town’s sailing activity is centered on the Puerto Galera Yacht Club (PGYC), which has been associated with local regattas and boating events. Among the sailing events held in Puerto Galera are the Easter Regatta, Christmas Regatta, and All Souls Day Regatta, which have helped establish the town’s reputation in Philippine sailing. PGYC has also opened its Small Boat Program to local youths, providing scholarship to deserving athletes - some of whom have joined the National Sailing Team, and have competed in some of the most prestigious international regattas.

== Environment ==
The accelerated development of tourism jeopardizes the preservation of its delicate ecological system consumed by "overdevelopment due to a thriving but runaway free-market tourism". Currently, this appears to be the "biggest problem" of Puerto Galera. Accelerated tourist oriented development poses degradation to the environment, among which, seawater pollution brought about by improper sewage and wastewater discharges. Unless serious action is taken, with regular seawater monitoring, this situation poses a serious threat to the sustainability of various tourist activities at the beaches.

In the summer of 1998, extensive coral bleaching occurred around Medio Island, and a large section of a shallow coral reef system (referred to as the "Coral Gardens") died. Since then, the coral has regrown with a larger diversity of coral species replacing the prolific table corals. Corals in Puerto Galera were largely unaffected by the 2010 El Niño event. The local government declared the 4,828 ha of municipal waters (12,690 ha) as protected waters, giving special protection to the corals and reef fishes.

In 2006, two super typhoons damaged the shallow reefs around Escarceo Point. A major section of the faster-growing coral species growing up to a depth of 6 metres (20 ft) was destroyed. This represented about 5% of the coral reef in the area. Extensive signs of new coral recruitment were noted in mid-2008. Acropora species (staghorn and table coral) rapidly recolonized the area so that most of the damaged coral has been replaced with new growth.

== Education ==
The Puerto Galera Schools District Office governs all educational institutions within the municipality. It oversees the management and operations of all private and public, from primary to secondary schools.

=== Primary and elementary schools ===
- Ambang Mangyan School
- Anastacio Cataquis Sabina Unson Memorial School
- Aninuan Christian Training School
- Aninuan Elementary School
- Baclayan Mangyan School
- Balatero Elementary School
- Holy Child Montessori
- Isidoro Suzara Memorial School
- Lapantay Mangyan School
- Lucena A. Datinginoo Memorial School
- Malago Mangyan School
- Minolo Elementary School
- Pagturian Mangyan School
- Paraway Mangyan School
- Puerto Galera Academy
- Puerto Galera Central School
- Sabang Elementary School
- San Antonio Elementary School
- San Isidro Elementary School
- Sipit Saburan Mangyan School
- Sto. Nino Elementary School
- Tabinay Elementary School
- Talipanan Mangyan School
- Villaflor Elementary School

=== Secondary schools ===
- Facundo C. Lopez - Palangan Integrated School
- Puerto Galera National High School
- Puerto Galera National High School (Dulangan Ext)
- Puerto Galera National High School (San Isidro Ext)

=== Higher educational institutions ===
- Gloders College
- Prince of Peace College
- Colegio De Puerto Galera

== Gallery ==
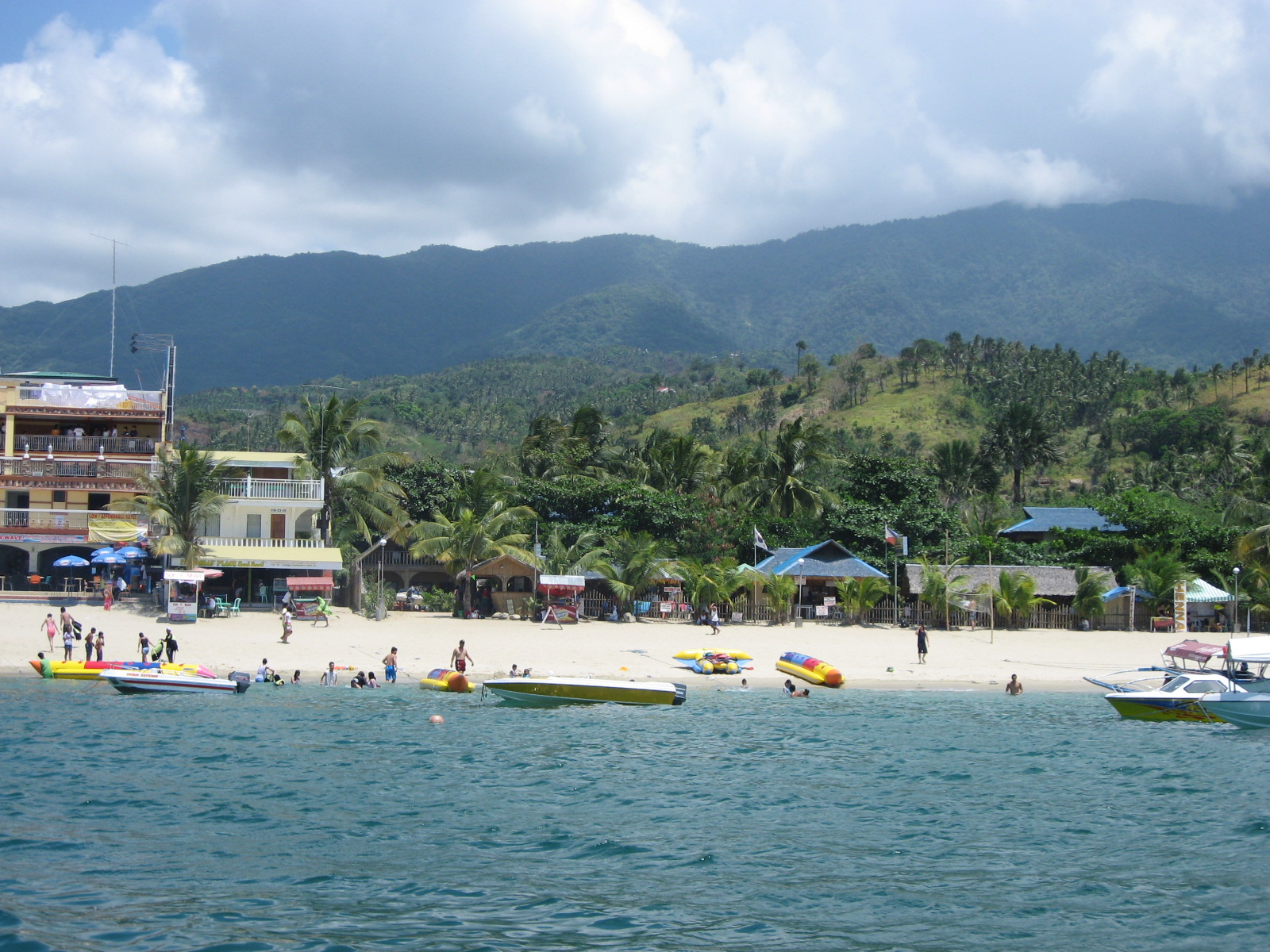
Puerto Galera white beach

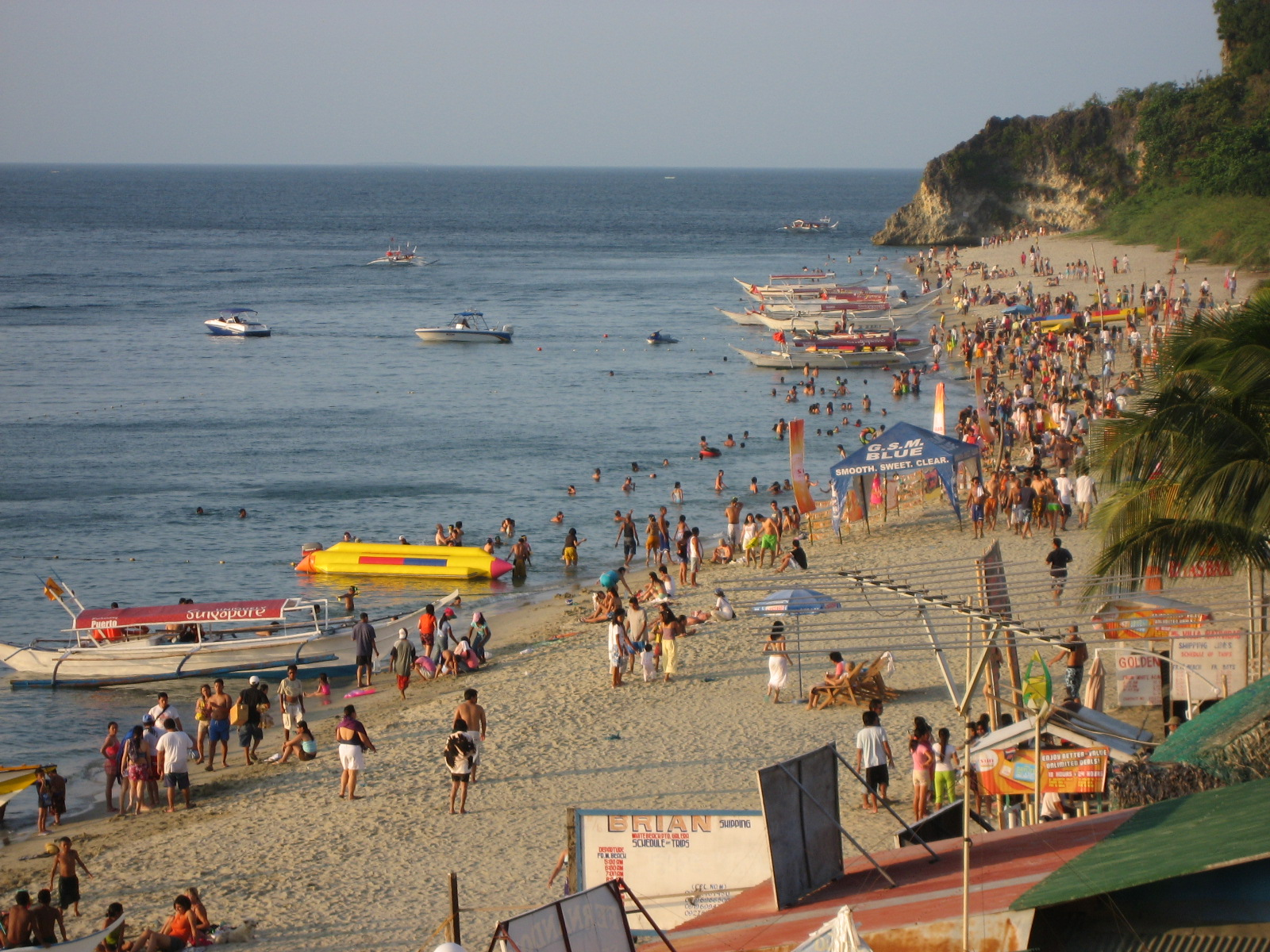
White Beach at sunset, looking towards the north-east end

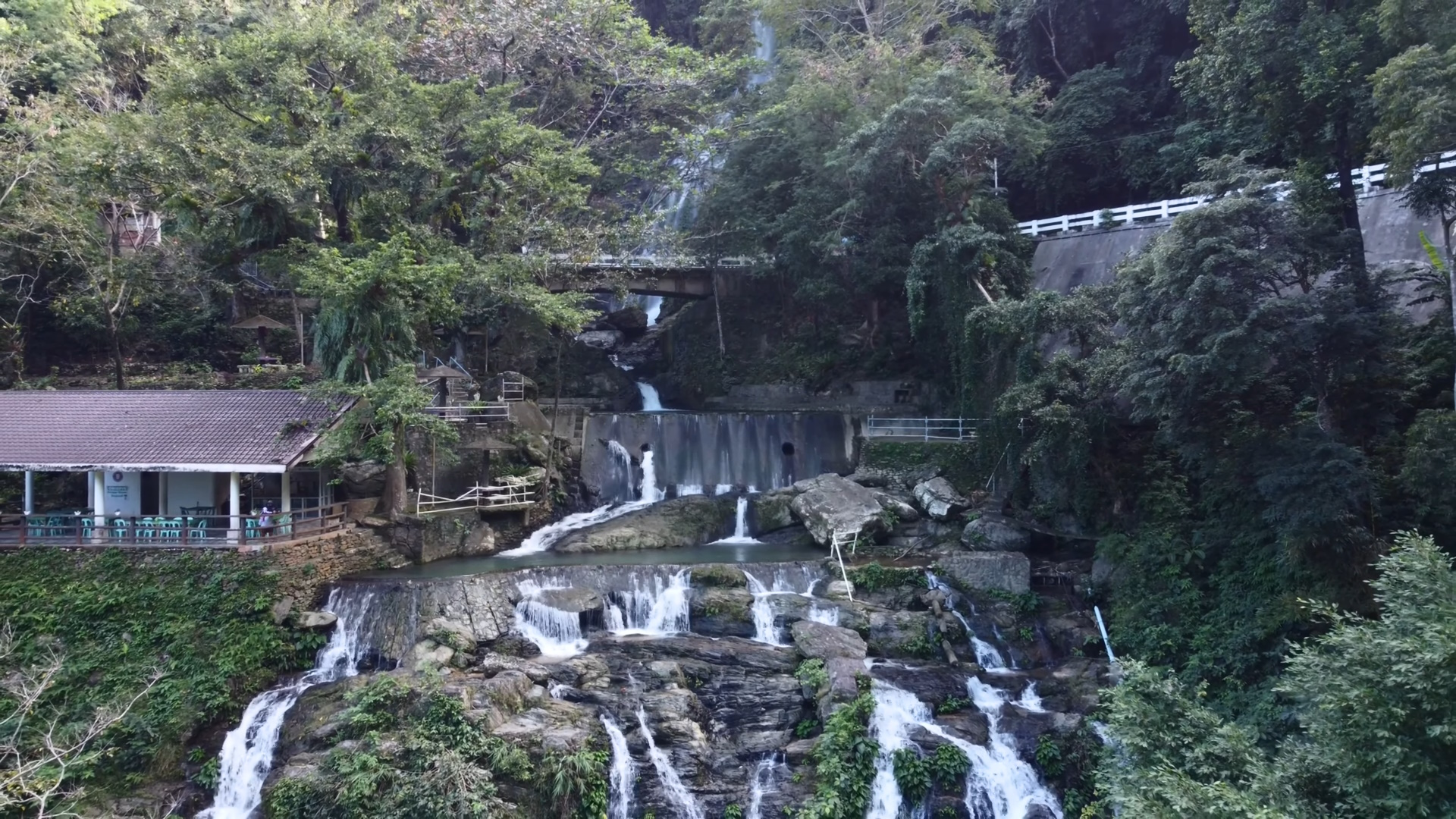
Tamaraw Falls

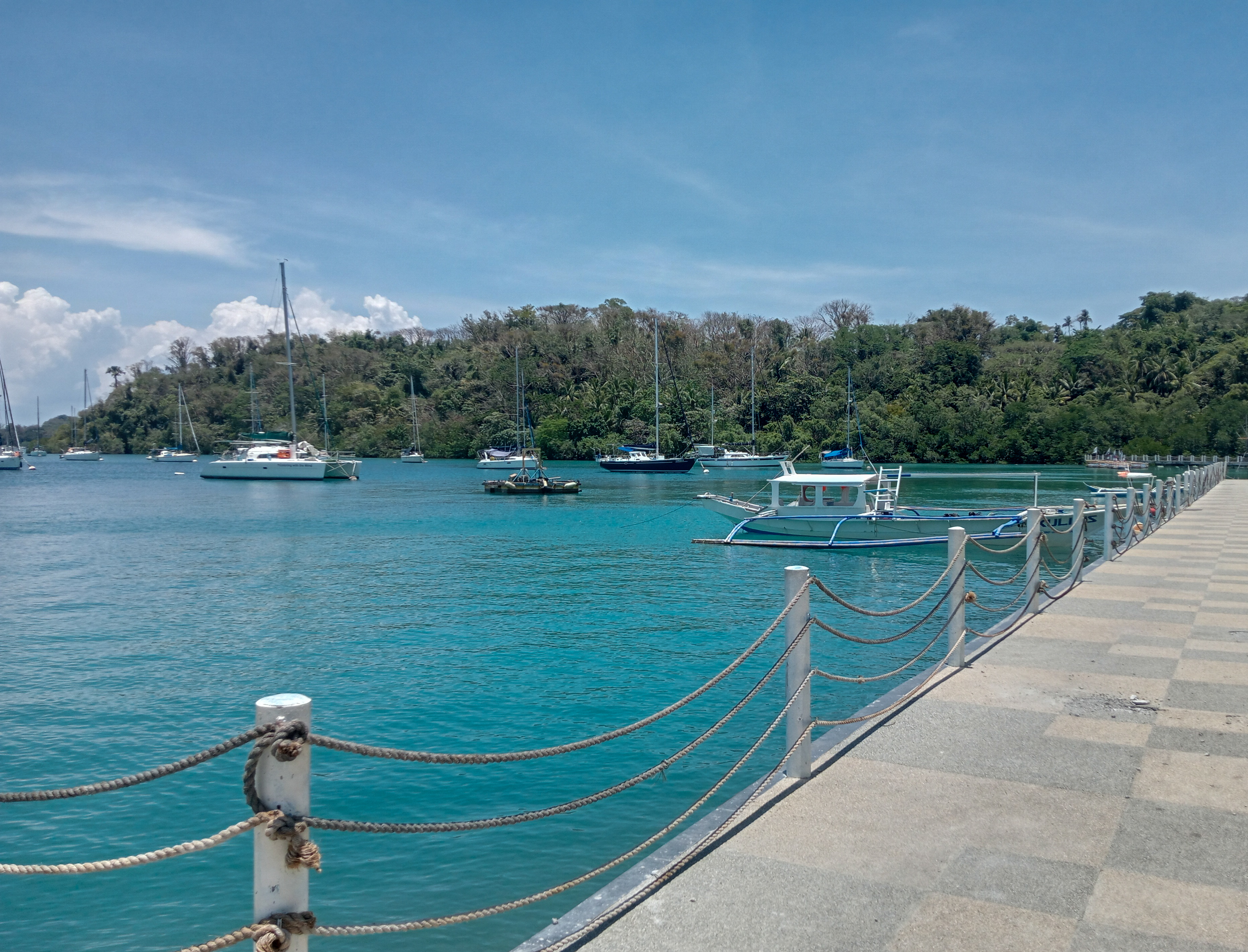
Muelle Port

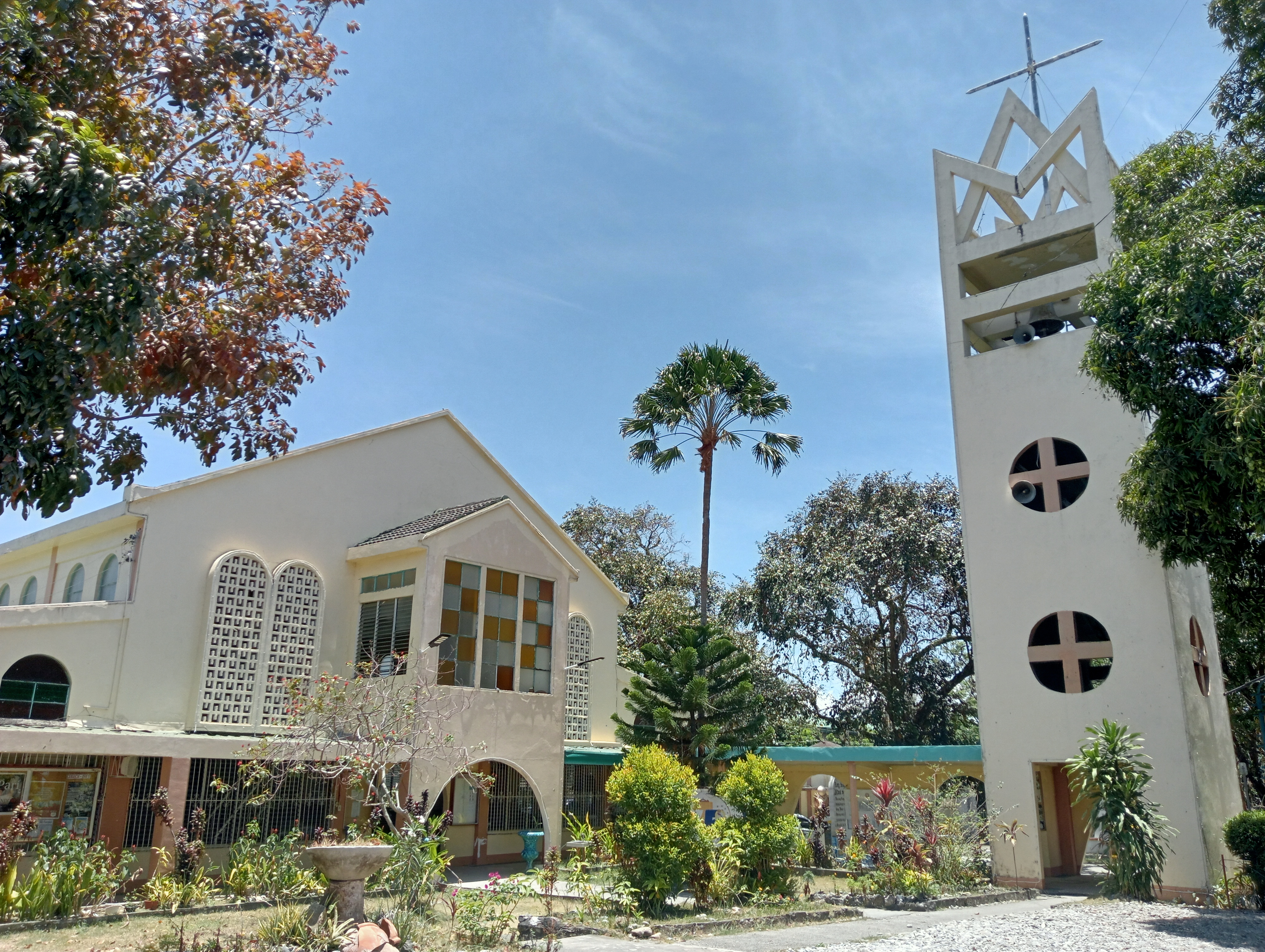
Puerto Galera Church

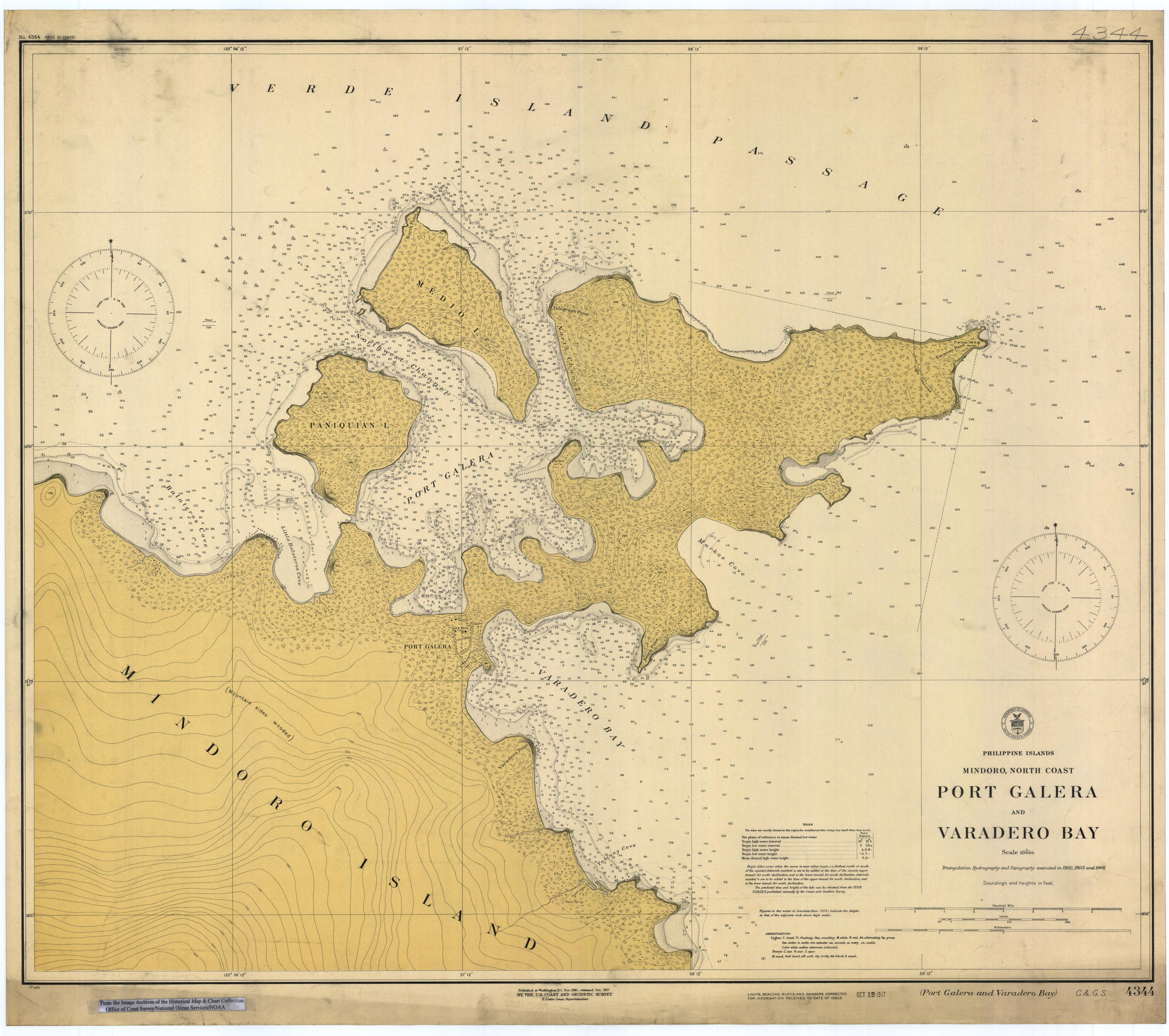
Nautical chart of Puerto Galera's harbor (1917)
