= Bantay dagat =

Volunteer organisation in the Philippines

The bantay dagat, also known as the sea patrol, are community-based volunteer organizations in the Philippines that work with local and national government agencies within 15 kilometers of the shore to protect the marine environment, particularly by patrolling against illegal fishing and assisting in rescue operations. They operate under the Bureau of Fisheries and Aquatic Resources (BFAR) of the Department of Agriculture.

Bantay dagat is "a participatory approach designed for coastal law enforcement which has existed in the Philippines since the 1970s." The current structure was established in 1994 at the behest of Senator Nina Rasul. The organizations work with the Department of Agriculture, Department of the Interior and Local Government, the Philippine Navy, and the Philippine Coast Guard, among other agencies. By 2000, there were more than 100,000 bantay dagat volunteers.

Several bantay dagat leaders have been killed in the line of duty, including one in Batangas in 2009.

Volunteers may receive a small honorarium and other benefits, similar to those provided to Philippine tanods, who serve as community watchmen.

== See also ==
- Philippine Coast Guard
