= Verde Island =

Island in the Philippines

Isla Verde
Native name: Pulo ng Verde
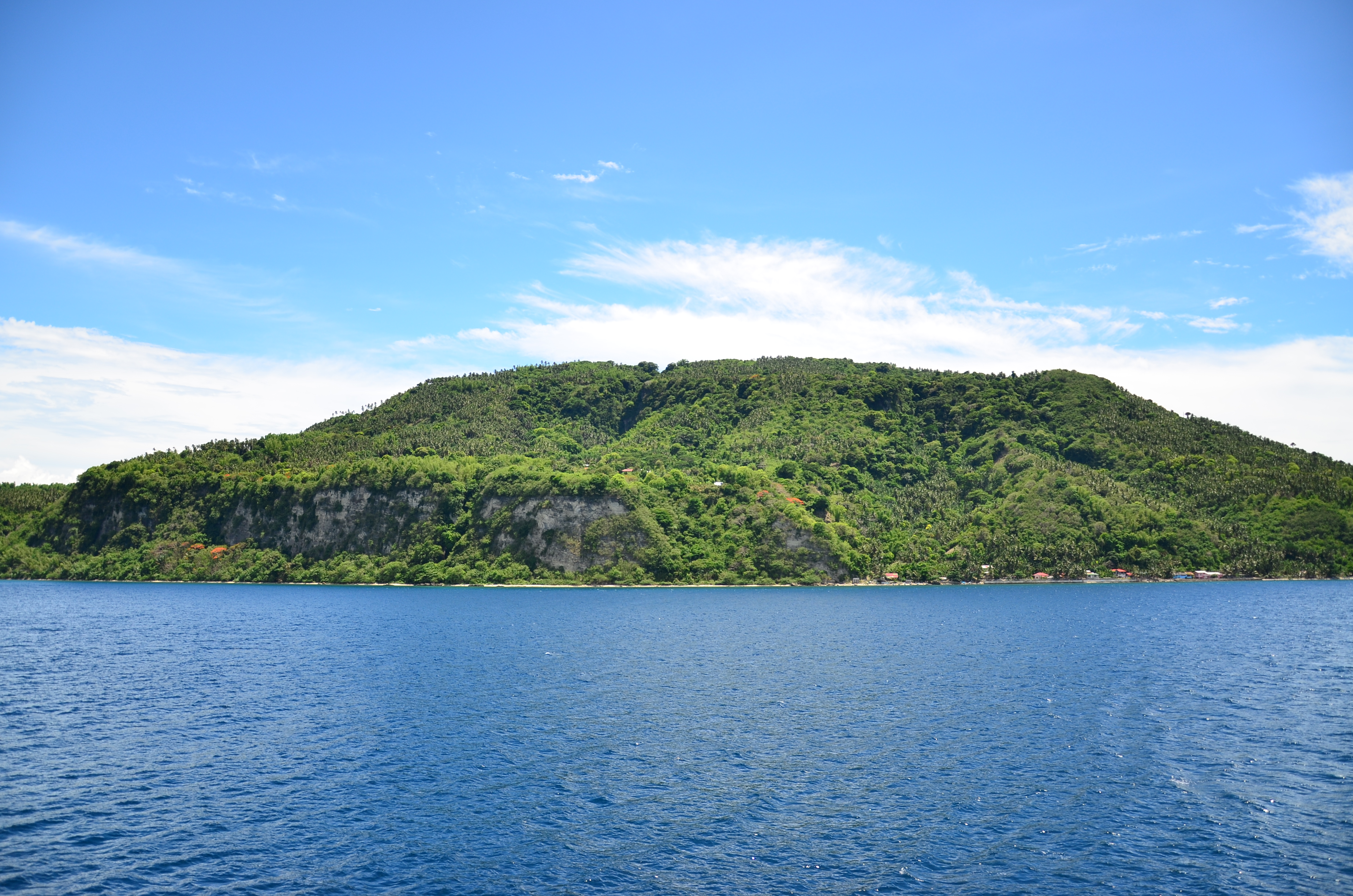
- View of the Island

- Location within Philippines

Geography
- Location: Verde Island Passage
- Coordinates: 13°32′59″N 121°4′15″E
- Highest elevation: 300 m (1000 ft)
- Highest point: Liponpon Peak

Administration
- Philippines
- Region: Calabarzon
- Province: Batangas
- City: Batangas City
- Barangays: Liponpon; San Agapito; San Agustin East; San Agustin West; San Andres; San Antonio

Demographics
- Population: 5,075 (as of 2020)
- Ethnic groups: Tagalogs

Additional information

Verde Island is a volcanic island situated along the bodies of Verde Island Passage between the islands of Luzon and Mindoro, Philippines. It was in 1988 when a small village was connected to mains electricity through the effort of a European project using technologies such as solar panels for the island's self-sufficiency. Since then, it has been declared by the Philippine Tourism Authority as one of the country's marine reserves.

== Geography ==
Verde Island lies south of Brgy. Ilijan, Batangas City and is separated from Luzon by the North Pass. It takes 1 hour and 30 minutes by a boat or 25 minutes by a ferry boat from Batangas City Port to reach the island.

Famous destinations in the island include:

- Mahabang Buhangin, a kilometer-long stretch of white sand beach.
- Cueva Sitio, a cave that leads to the other side of the island.

Verde Island has been a destination for tourists and divers in Batangas City since 1999, after the Pastor clan opened an P80 million resort at Brgy. San Antonio.

== See also ==
- Verde Island Passage
- Batangas Bay
