= Fisheries in the Philippines =

Overview of fishing in Philippines

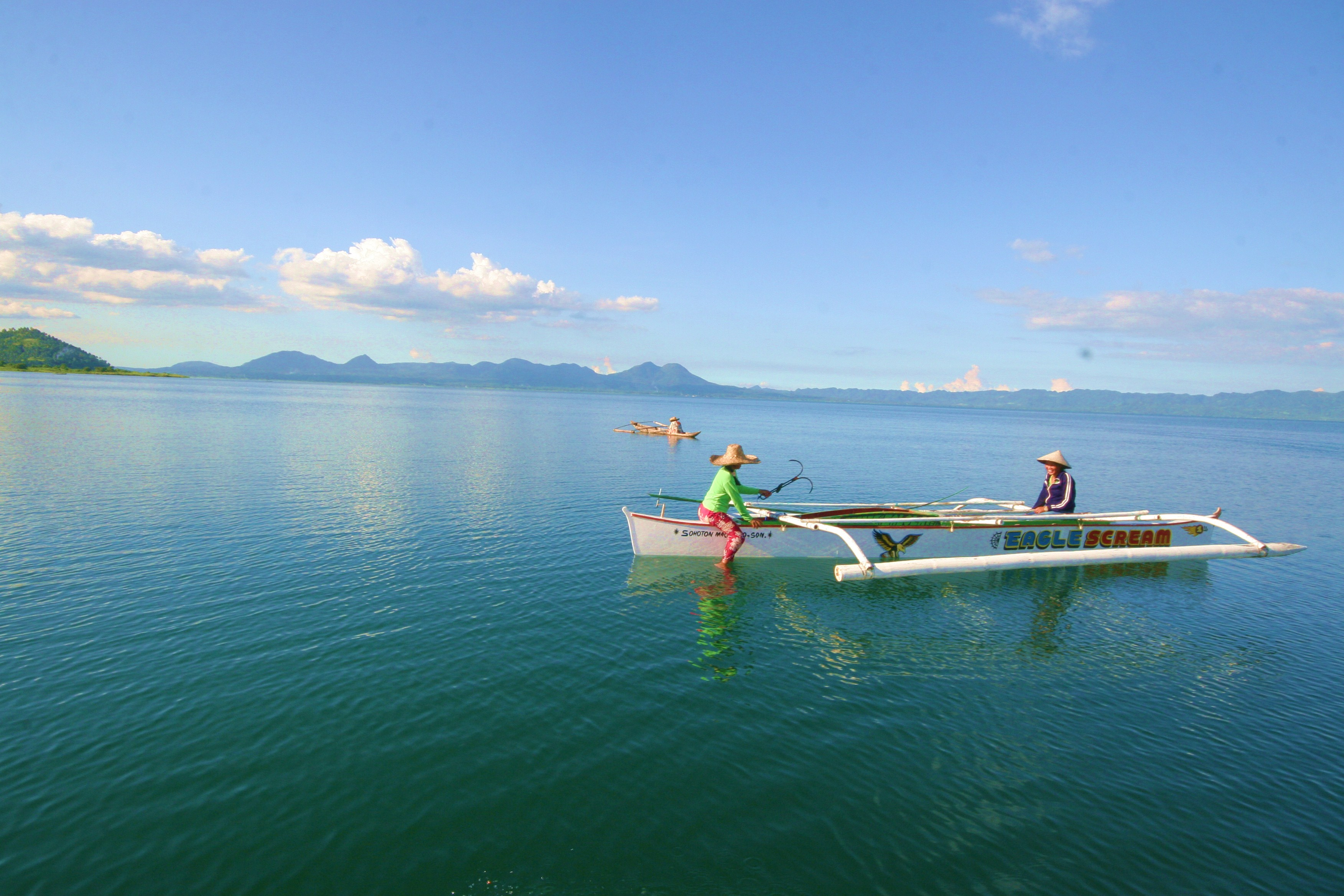
A small bangka fishing boat near Siargao

The Philippines is an archipelagic country with a large coastal population. In many areas, communities rely heavily on fisheries for subsistence and livelihoods. Both capture fisheries and aquaculture occur inland and at sea, producing various fish, shellfish, other invertebrates, and seaweed.

Capture fisheries are divided into municipal fisheries and commercial fisheries. Municipal fisheries are those within 15 kilometres (9.3 mi) of the shore, fished with small boats. They fall under the jurisdiction of local government units (cities and municipalities), and are expected to prioritize local residents. There are more stringent rules on the fishing techniques that can be caught in municipal waters, and the local government is responsible for the sustainable management of its fisheries. Commercial fisheries consist of larger boats fishing in non-municipal national waters or international waters. Commercial fishing vessels are generally not allowed to fish in municipal waters, although local governments can permit commercial fishing in the outer third of their waters at their discretion. The aquaculture sector includes fish, shrimp, and seaweed farms in artificial ponds, inland waters, and nearshore waters.

The fisheries sector employs over 2 million people, creates around 1.5% of GDP, and produces 2% of all global fisheries products. It is an important source of domestic nutrition and a net source of exports. Many fisheries have been poorly managed, with overfishing depleting fish populations. Other challenges facing Philippine fisheries include habitat destruction, pollution, and climate change. Despite government interventions, most fisherfolk remain poor. The growth of commercial fisheries led to competition with municipal fisheries, and despite strong laws, there are implementation and enforcement challenges to prevent illegal, unreported, and unregulated fishing.

Fisheries management is complex, with responsibilities divided between several national agencies alongside local governments. Modern management efforts have aimed to ensure fisheries are sustainable, and prioritize the use of fisheries by local fisherfolk. Common management techniques include closed seasons to protect fish during critical parts of their life cycles, and the establishment of marine protected areas at both national and local levels.

== Resources ==
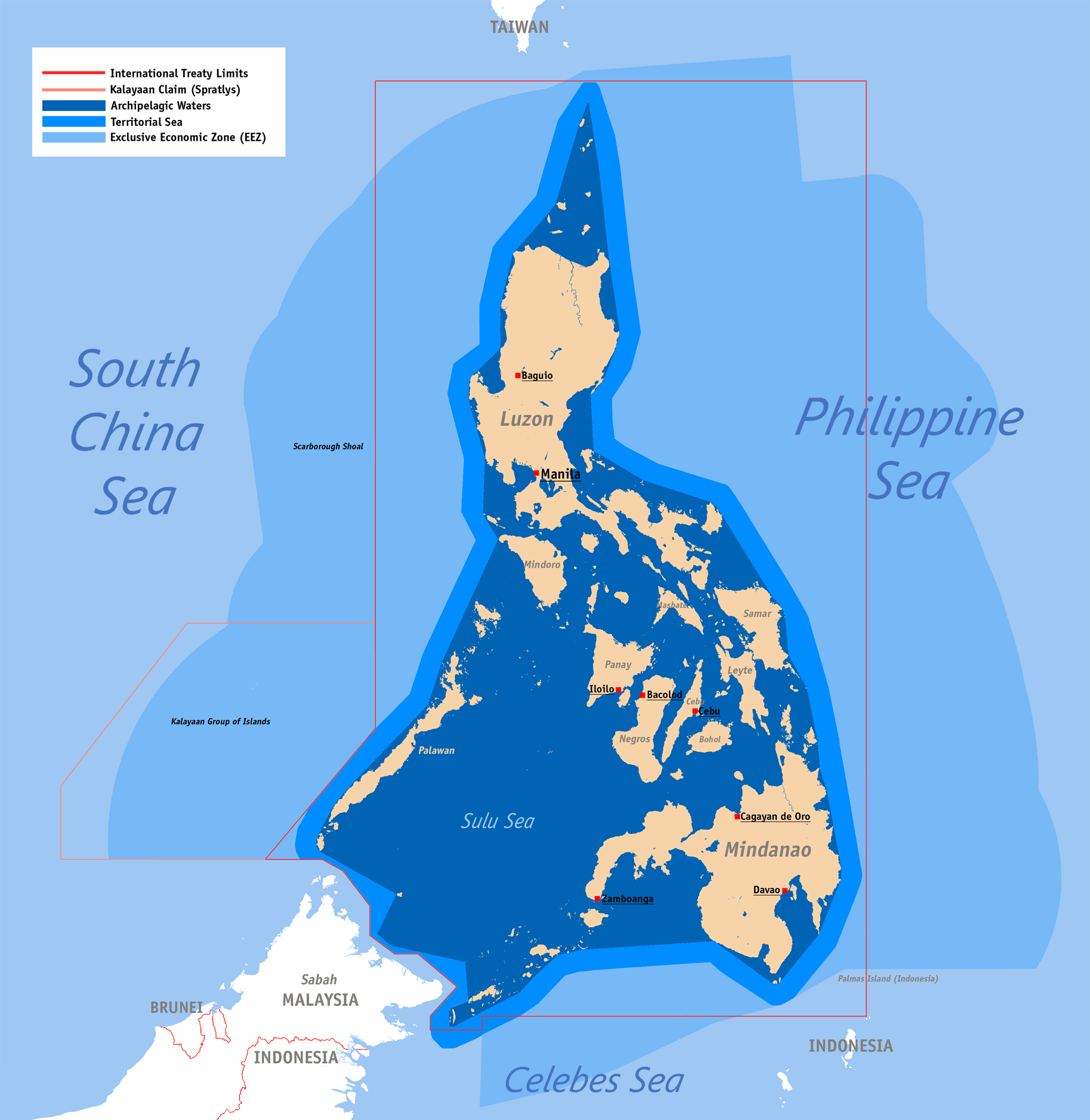
Territorial waters and exclusive economic zone of the Philippines

The Philippines is an archipelagic state whose over 7,000 islands with their large coastal population are surrounded by waters including 2,263,816 square kilometres (874,064 sq mi) of exclusive economic zone and 679,800 square kilometres (262,500 sq mi) of territorial sea, of which 184,600 square kilometres (71,300 sq mi) is on continental shelf of 200 metres (660 ft) deep or less, and 27,000 square kilometres (10,000 sq mi) is coral reefs. The total coastline extends 36,289 kilometres (22,549 mi). Inland waters include 246,063 hectares (608,030 acres) of swamplands (106,328 hectares (262,740 acres) freshwater, 137,735 hectares (340,350 acres) brackish), 200,000 hectares (490,000 acres) of lakes, 31,000 hectares (77,000 acres) of rivers, and 19,000 hectares (47,000 acres) of reservoirs.

Highly productive due to large amounts of sunlight, and stable and warm temperatures, the country's waters are highly diverse. The Philippines lies within the Coral Triangle, and one area, the Verde Island Passage, has the world's highest recorded diversity of marine species. Reef fish provide between 15 and 30% of municipal fisheries catch, with some islands relying on reefs for as much as 70% of their catch. There are 19 seagrass species, with seagrass meadows covering up to 24% of territorial waters. The value of marine ecosystem services is estimated to be at least US$966.6 billion, not including benefits from extended continental shelf area.

Philippine fisheries include small and large pelagic fisheries, demersal fisheries, and invertebrate fisheries. Small pelagic species are the most commonly caught for low-cost domestic consumption. Large pelagic species are of higher value. These resources are exploited through municipal (small-scale inland and coastal) and commercial capture fisheries, as well as aquaculture. Recreational fishing is relatively minor.

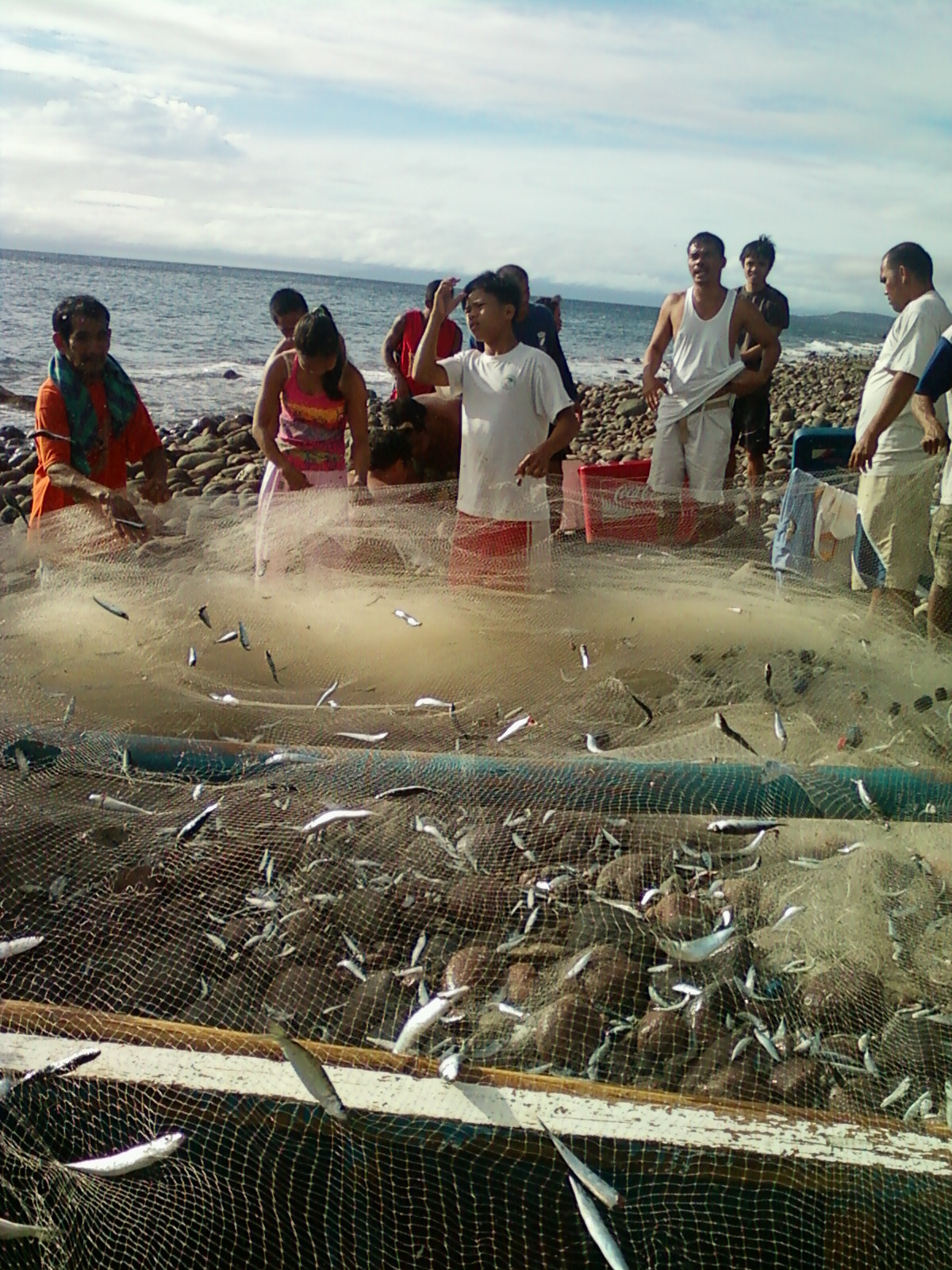
Silver fish being taken out of a net in Banton, Romblon

The cheap but nutritious sardine fishery consists of nine species, although there are six main ones: Bali sardinella, goldstripe sardinella, white sardinella, spotted sardinella, white sardine, and fimbriated sardines. The most fished small pelagic species is Bali sardinella, followed by roundscad, bigeye scad (and others of the Carangidae family), squid, and anchovies (of the Stolephorus genus). Other small pelagics include mackerels of the Rastrelliger genus, round herrings of the Clupeidae family, fusiliers of the Caesionidae family, flying fish, halfbeaks, Indian oil sardines, and Indian mackerel. Their presence is generally seasonal.

There are 21 tuna species, 6 of which are fished commercially, and of these 4 are the most important: yellowfin tuna, skipjack tuna, Eastern little tuna, and frigate tuna. Other large pelagic species include marlin, swordfish, and sailfish. The bigeye tuna and bullet tuna are caught in some quantity, while the albacore tuna, longtail tuna, striped bonito, and Pacific bluefin tuna are caught in minor quantities. The frigate tuna, bullet tuna, and eastern little tuna are found in shallow waters, while the rest are caught in deeper ocean. Some tuna fishing is undertaken outside of Philippine waters, although the majority of tuna catch is domestic. Trolling is used to catch mahi-mahi and marlin.

Commonly fished demersal species are threadfin bream, slipmouths, blue crab, groupers, rabbitfish, spadefish, and catfish. Deep-sea fishing is less common, with the only commonly fished species being Squalidae (dogfish) sharks. These species, especially of the Centrophorus, are harvested for the squalene within their liver oils, which is extracted for export. These dogfish fisheries go through boom and bust cycles of perhaps half a decade or so as fishing depletes the population. Other deep-sea products caught include fish of the Trichiurus genus, mostly consumed by ethnic Chinese, the manetail snake eel, mostly exported to South Korea, and shrimp including Plesionika species, Heterocarpus sibogae, and Heterocarpus gibbosus, popular among Taiwanese buyers.

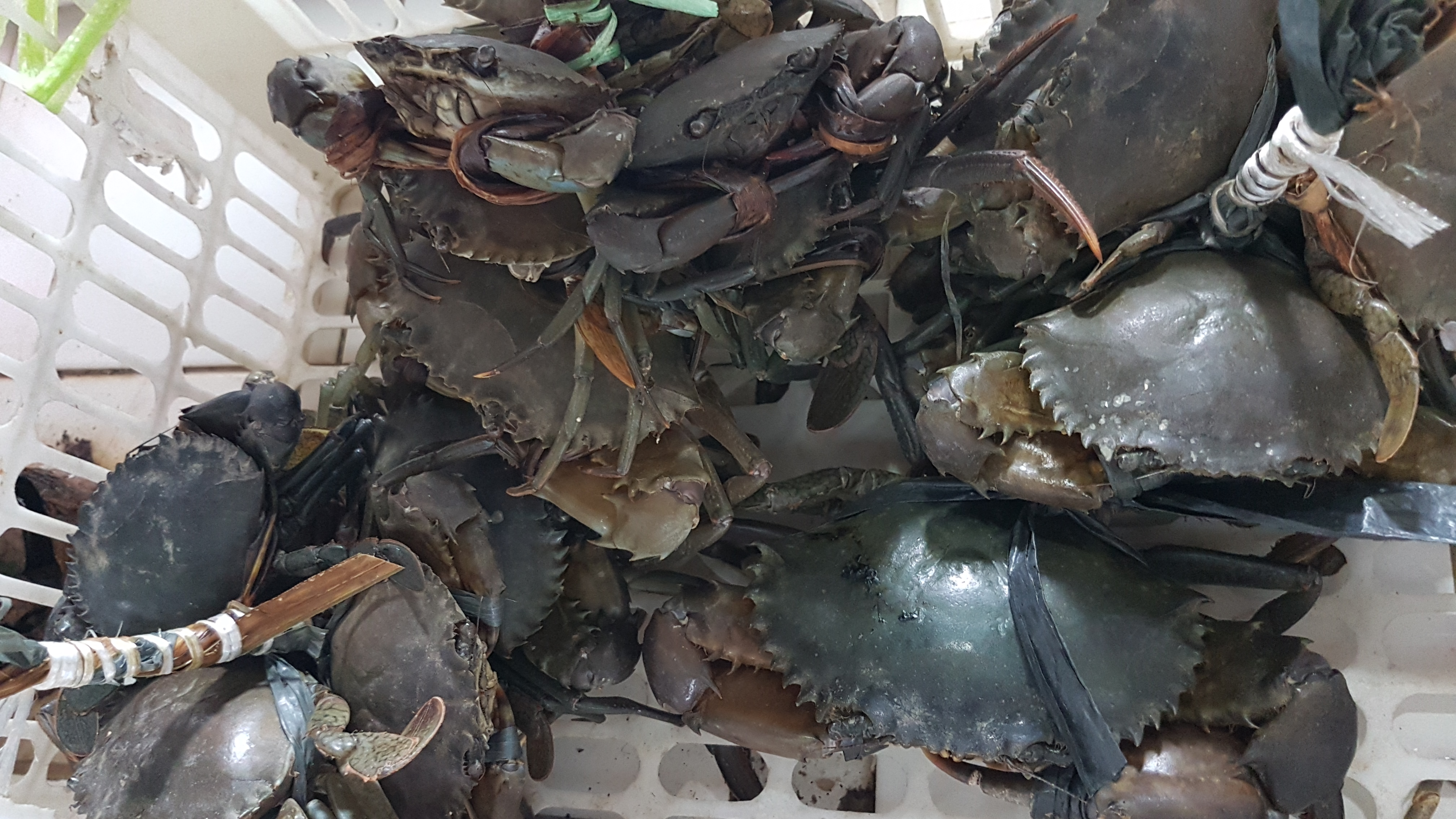
Live Scylla tranquebarica being sold at a market

The country has 51 swimming crab species, 7 of which are fished for market. The blue crab Portunus pelagicus makes up 90% of all catches, with the rest is mostly made up of Portunus sanguinolentus, Charybdis feriata, Charybdis natator, Scylla oceanica, (Note: Not always considered a separate species from Scylla serrata) Scylla serrata, and Podophthalmus vigil. Non-marketed species are often caught as by-catch, or in the case of Thalamita species, by hand.

There are significant fisheries for shrimp of the Acetes genus, Penaeus monodon, Penaeus merguiensis, Penaeus semisulcatus, Metapenaeus ensis, and Trachypenaeus fulvus. Squid species harvested include species from the Loliginidae family, such as Uroteuthis bartschi, Uroteuthis duvaucelii, swordtip squid, Uroteuthis singhalensis, and bigfin reef squid. Also present are Pharaoh cuttlefish and Sepia esculenta. Octopus species include Amphioctopus membranaceus.

Other harvested commodities include sea urchins such as Tripneustes gratilla, sea cucumbers such as Holothuria scabra, Trochidae and related species such as Rochia nilotica, windowpane oyster, abalone (Haliotis asinina), and seven species of giant clams: Tridacna gigas, Tridacna derasa, Tridacna squamosa, Tridacna maxima, Tridacna crocea, Hippopus hippopus, and Hippopus porcellanus. There is also a specific market for ornamental shells.

=== Fishing grounds ===
The Bureau of Fisheries and Aquatic Resources classifies 8 seas, 10 bays, 9 gulfs, 3 channels, 5 straits, and 2 passages as major marine fishing grounds:

- East Sulu Sea (9,288 square kilometres (3,586 sq mi))
- West Sulu Sea (29,993 square kilometres (11,580 sq mi))
- South Sulu Sea (112,642 square kilometres (43,491 sq mi))
- Sibuyan Sea (8,127 square kilometres (3,138 sq mi))
- Visayan Sea (3,096 square kilometres (1,195 sq mi))
- Samar Sea (3,870 square kilometres (1,490 sq mi))
- Camotes Sea (2,477 square kilometres (956 sq mi))
- Bohol Sea (7,946 square kilometres (3,068 sq mi))
- Manila Bay (1,935 square kilometres (747 sq mi))
- Tayabas Bay (2,213 square kilometres (854 sq mi))
- Imuruan Bay (1,087.80 square kilometres (420.00 sq mi))
- Lamon Bay (2,838 square kilometres (1,096 sq mi))
- San Miguel Bay (774 square kilometres (299 sq mi))
- Iligan Bay (1,811.16 square kilometres (699.29 sq mi))
- Butuan Bay (516 square kilometres (199 sq mi))
- Sibuguey Bay (1,935 square kilometres (747 sq mi))
- Tawi-Tawi Bay (592.40 square kilometres (228.73 sq mi))
- Illana Bay (2,128.50 square kilometres (821.82 sq mi))
- Lingayen Gulf (2,064 square kilometres (797 sq mi))
- Ragay Gulf (3,225 square kilometres (1,245 sq mi))
- Asid Gulf (619 square kilometres (239 sq mi))
- Panay Gulf (2,311 square kilometres (892 sq mi))
- Lagonoy Gulf (1,935 square kilometres (747 sq mi))
- Albay Gulf (413 square kilometres (159 sq mi))
- Leyte Gulf (2,724 square kilometres (1,052 sq mi))
- Moro Gulf (12,900 square kilometres (5,000 sq mi))
- Davao Gulf (4,024 square kilometres (1,554 sq mi))
- Babuyan Channel (3,612 square kilometres (1,395 sq mi))
- Jintotolo Channel (280 square kilometres (110 sq mi))
- Maqueda Channel (129 square kilometres (50 sq mi))
- Mindoro Strait (3,426.20 square kilometres (1,322.86 sq mi))
- Iloilo Strait (1,006 square kilometres (388 sq mi))
- Tablas Strait (1,935 square kilometres (747 sq mi))
- Tañon Strait (2,786.40 square kilometres (1,075.84 sq mi))
- Cebu Strait (1,818.90 square kilometres (702.28 sq mi))
- Burias Pass (1,393.20 square kilometres (537.92 sq mi))
- Ticao Pass (804.75 square kilometres (310.72 sq mi))

Major inland fisheries include:

- Laguna de Bay lake (88,055.24 hectares (217,589.2 acres))
- Taal Lake (22,918.76 hectares (56,633.5 acres))
- Naujan Lake (7,576.32 hectares (18,721.5 acres))
- Lake Buhi (1,630.30 hectares (4,028.6 acres))
- Lake Bato (2,617.81 hectares (6,468.7 acres))
- Lake Mainit (14,202.31 hectares (35,094.7 acres))
- Lake Wood (687.37 hectares (1,698.5 acres))
- Lake Dapao (974.14 hectares (2,407.2 acres))
- Lake Lanao (34,809.49 hectares (86,016.1 acres))
- Lake Buluan (5,032.73 hectares (12,436.1 acres))

== Capture fisheries ==
Top 10 caught commodities in 2022
Commodity	Volume (metric tons/MT)	Value (PhP)
Tuna	475,313.47	54,317,559,120
Sardines	336,171.88	12,781,256,340
Roundscad	172,268.17	16,934,618,770
Bigeye scad	112,743.91	12,646,930,160
Mackerel	74,815.47	9,903,233,550
Squid	57,302.61	8,607,329,610
Anchovies	52,993.62	4,311,634,570
Tilapia	52,126.25	4,529,873,220
Threadfin bream	33,973.38	5,373,593,250
Slipmouth	33,920.45	2,939,328,210
Others	587,317.37	70,219,629,600
TOTAL	1,988,946.58	202,564,986,400

Capture fisheries are officially divided into two kinds: municipal and commercial. Of overall fisheries production in 2020, 22.34% of production was from municipal capture fisheries, and 35.84% from commercial capture fisheries. The Luzon and Visayas areas have significant numbers of small-scale fisheries, while the Mindanao region has more large-scale commercial ventures, especially in the cities of General Santos and Zamboanga. The cost involved in capture fisheries are mostly operational, with less than 10% being fixed costs like licenses, taxes, and fees.

As of 2012, 51% of capture fishery was municipal, and 49% commercial. Key fishery species are caught by both fisheries, with commercial fisheries taking 61.2% of the 10 most caught species in 2012 while municipal fisheries caught 38.8%. As of 2022, capture fisheries produced 1.99 million metric tons (MT) of fisheries products worth PHP 202.56 billion. From 2013 to 2022 the volume being caught has decreased, however, the overall value of the catch increased over that time. The decrease in overall catch was unevenly distributed across the country, with some regions decreasing much more than others. Over half of caught fish come from five regions: IX, XII, Bangsamoro, VI, and V, in order of production. Region IX produces the most, 349,593.95 MT worth PHP 25,040,132,060. By volume, over half (53.12%) of the products landed in this region are sardines. By value, Region XII produces the most, PHP 28,210,320,790 from 281,843.09 MT, due to 80.25% by volume (79.24% by value) being tuna fisheries.

Landings at Philippine Fisheries Development Authority-managed ports in 2012
City/Municipality	Landings (tonnes)
General Santos	139,613
Navotas	137,650
Iloilo City	25,033
Lucena	20,600
Zamboanga City	5,213
Davao City	3,287
Sual	748

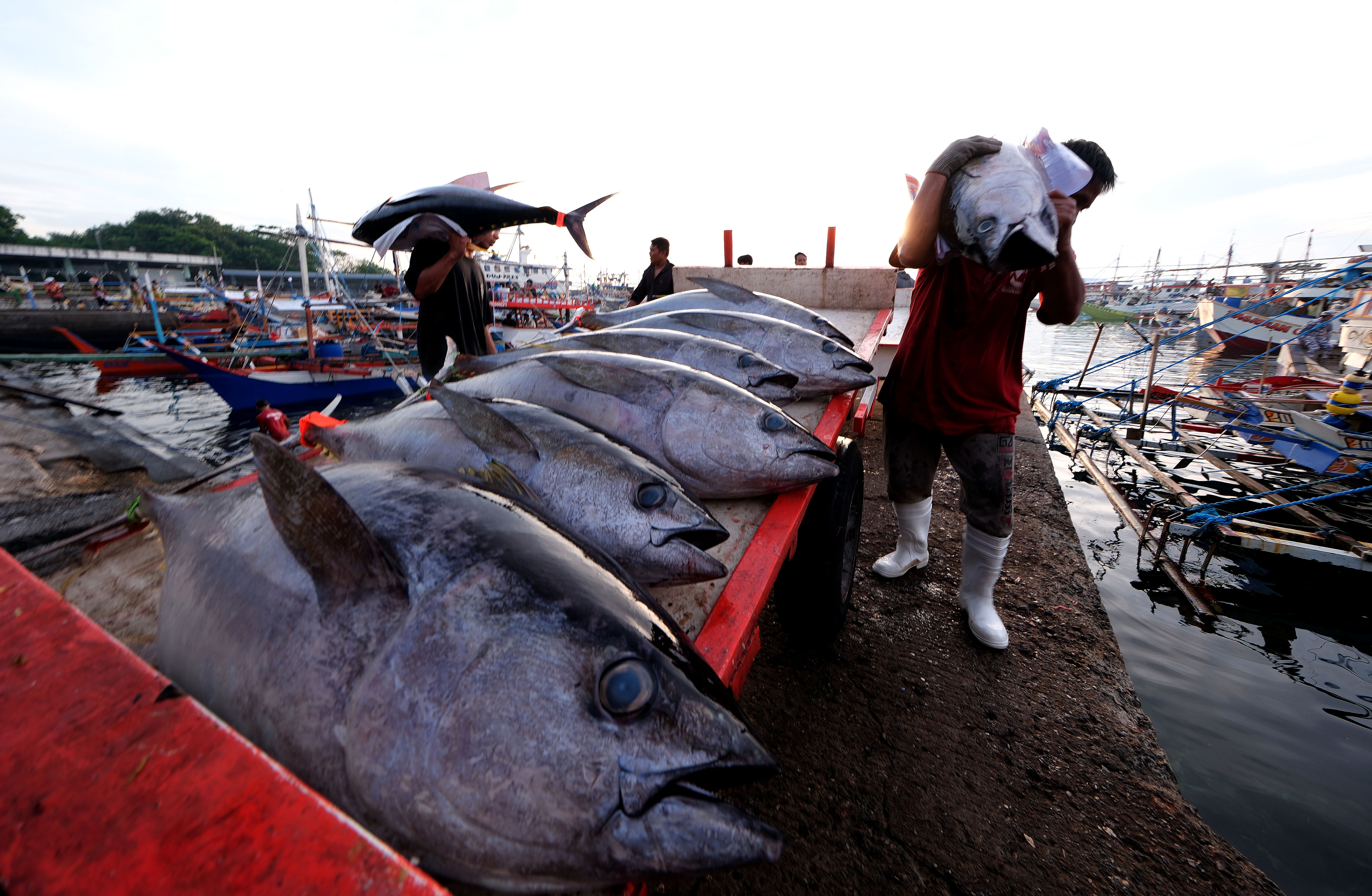
Tuna being unloaded at the General Santos Fish Port Complex

Capture fisheries unload at a mixture of large government ports (run by the Philippine Fisheries Development Authority (PFDA)), local government ports, private ports, and traditional landings. The large ports are more able to handle complex operations. Aquaculture produce is also sold at ports. General Santos is especially important for the commercial tuna fishery. Zamboanga City is the major port for sardine commercial fisheries, with the Zamboanga Peninsula region receiving 46% of sardine catch. The six most significant sardine fisheries are the Ragay Gulf-Ticao Pass-San Bernardino Strait area, the Bohol Sea, the East Sulu Sea and Sulu Archipelago, the Visayan Sea, the Moro Gulf and its associated Illana Bay, and Sibuguey Bay.

The larvae and juveniles of some species are sometimes deliberately fished. Dwarf pygmy goby fry, Stolephorus anchovy fry, and rabbitfish fry are caught for consumption. Other fry, such as milkfish, are caught to stock aquaculture. Juveniles caught for food are exported frozen and sold domestically, both fresh and dried, where they are used as finger food and as sauce ingredients.

=== Municipal fisheries ===
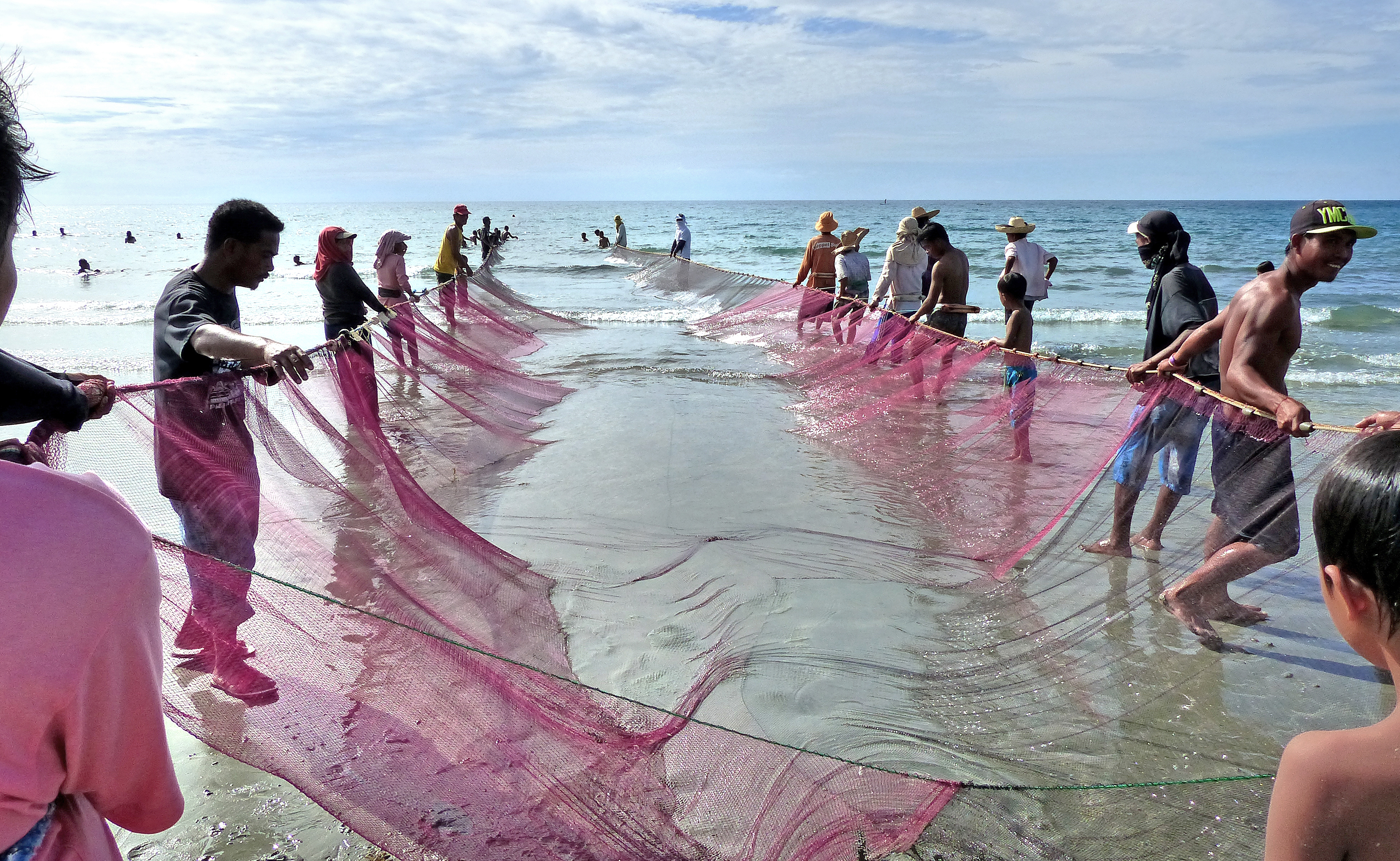
Fishing near the shore in Currimao

Municipal fisheries are defined as "fishing in coastal and inland waters with or without the use of boats that are 3 gross tonnes or less". Such vessels can be motorized, or non-motorized using paddles or sails. Municipal fisherfolk are often generalists, fishing for demersal and pelagic species. Municipal fisheries in 2020 included 952,188.62 MT of marine fisheries and 150,073.74 MT of inland fisheries. Most municipal fishing is done on an individual basis. As of 2020, there were 267,807 municipal fishing vessels.

Most inland fishing boats, which ply brackish waters, estuaries, lakes, reservoirs, and rivers, are smaller than 3 gross tonnes. In 2012, inland fisheries catch was 62% fish, 33% mollusks (such as snails), and 5% crustaceans (such as shrimps and prawns). Some municipal fisherfolk continue to rely on traditional methods, including hook-and-line fishing, beach seines, small nets and traps, fish corrals, hand spears, and the manual collection of seaweed and invertebrates. Otter and beam trawling now mostly targets shrimp. Trawls small enough to be deployed by boats smaller than 3 GT are known as baby trawls.

=== Commercial fisheries ===
The Philippine Fisheries Code of 1998 (RA 8550) classifies commercial fishing by boat size: 3.1 to 20 gross tonnes as small-scale, 20.1 to 150 gross tones as medium-scale, and anything larger as large-scale. Smaller commercial fishing boats fish both in municipal waters where permitted by the municipality and in water further out to sea (more than 15 kilometres (9.3 mi) from the shore), while others are fully banned from operating close to shore. Medium-sized boats are commonly used for seine fishing. Large boats are also used for seine fishing, but their size allows them to fish in waters very far from their home port.

Large commercial fisheries focus on tuna or seasonal mackerel and roundscad. The largest commercial fishery is the tuna fishery, followed by the sardine market. The various roundscad species make up the third largest commodity. Tuna is the only commodity caught outside Philippine waters. The sardine market is generally over two-thirds commercial. Commercial fishing boats may operate together, for example with some boats catching fish at sea while another transports catch from those boats to market. Commercial fisheries captured 975,205.08 MT of produce in 2020, decreasing to 862,686.35 MT worth PHP 74.93 billion in 2022. This was part of wider fluctuations from 2013 to 2022 in volume and value, although volume overall has decreased.

== Aquaculture ==
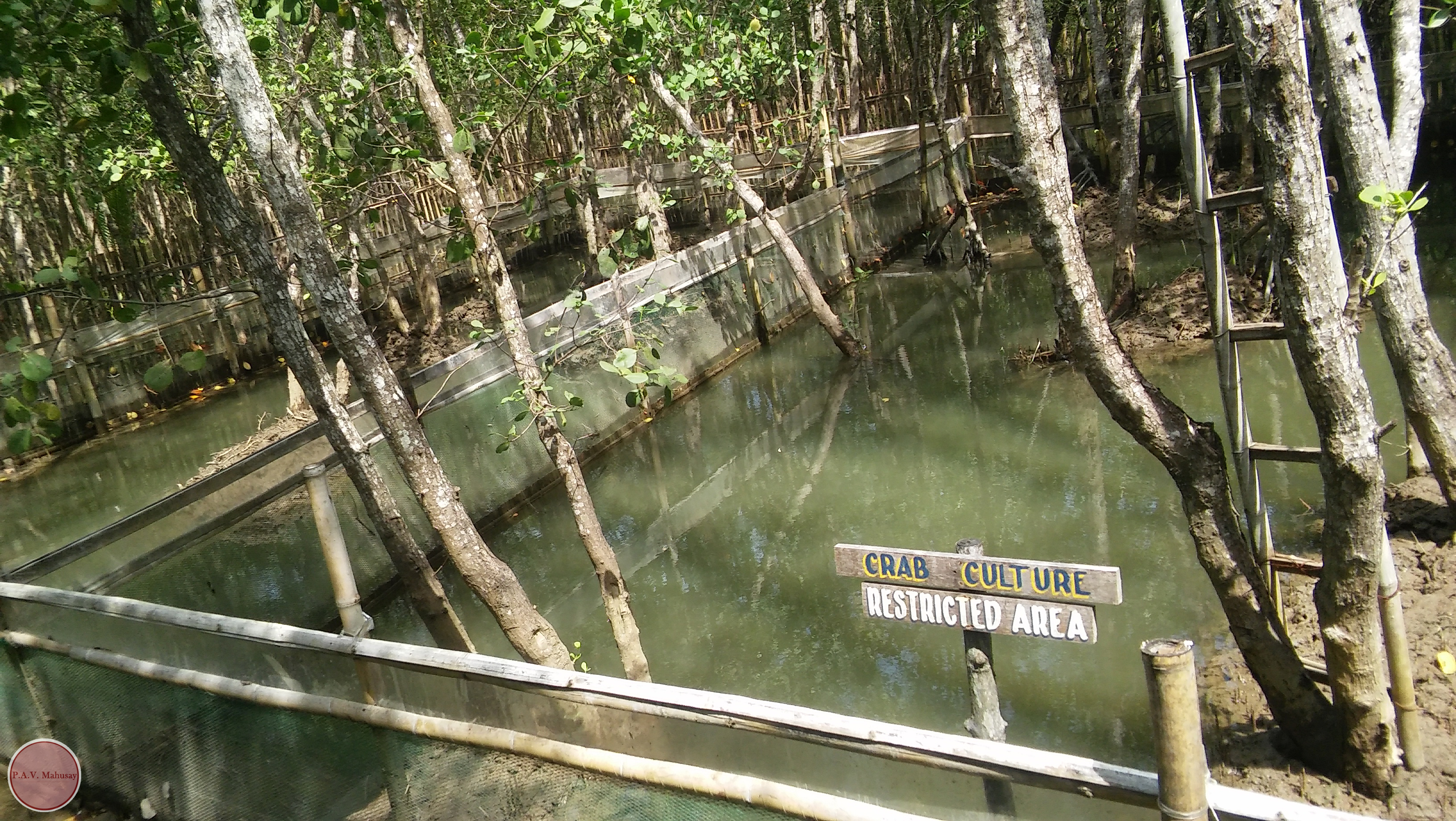
A crab pond in the Bakhawan Eco-Park

Aquaculture is carried out in fresh, brackish, and marine water. Farms are generally placed in municipal areas, either on land or in coastal and nearshore areas. Of the 913.40 MT of brackish aquaculture production in 2020, 93% was milkfish. Of the 170,939.11 MT of freshwater fishpond production in 2020, 96% was tilapia. Freshwater cage aquaculture is also dominated by tilapia, which makes up 86.82% of production. Freshwater fish pens produced 39,847.67 MT, of which 17,020.75 (42.71%) was tilapia, 12,039.36 (30.21%) milkfish, and 10,781.00 (27.06%) carp. A small amount, 5.21 MT, is produced in rice-fish systems, with 3.70 MT (71.02%) of this being tilapia. Marine fish cages produce 149,661.38 MT, 99.91% of which is milkfish. Milkfish similarly dominates marine fish pen production, making up 832.68 MT of the 846.38 total.

The most commonly farmed shrimp is the tiger prawn, which made up 42,453.94 MT of the total 70,474.77 ton 2020 shrimp production. The second most farmed was whiteleg shrimp, of which 20,612.48 MT were produced. Mariculture activities produce 1,540,914.30 MT, of which 1,468,653.27 (95.3%) is seaweed, 53,032.06 is oyster, and 19,228.97 is mussel.

In 2018, Philippine aquaculture produced 826.01 thousand MT of fish, crustaceans, and mollusks, worth $1.89 billion, the 11th largest national production in the world accounting for 1.01% of global production. The aquaculture sector made up 41.82% of the value of Philippine fisheries in 2020. This included 1.48 million MT of seaweed and other aquatic plants, 4.56% of 2018's global seaweed production. In 2021, there were 1.34 million MT of seaweed produced, which was 3.82% of global production, and the 4th largest amount of any country. The production of seaweed through aquaculture grew from 707.0 thousand tonnes in 2000 to around 1,500 thousand tonnes annually in the years since then. Many seaweed farms are small-scale and farmer-owned. Seaweed farming often forms a second stream of income, supplementing activities such as fishing.

== Productivity ==
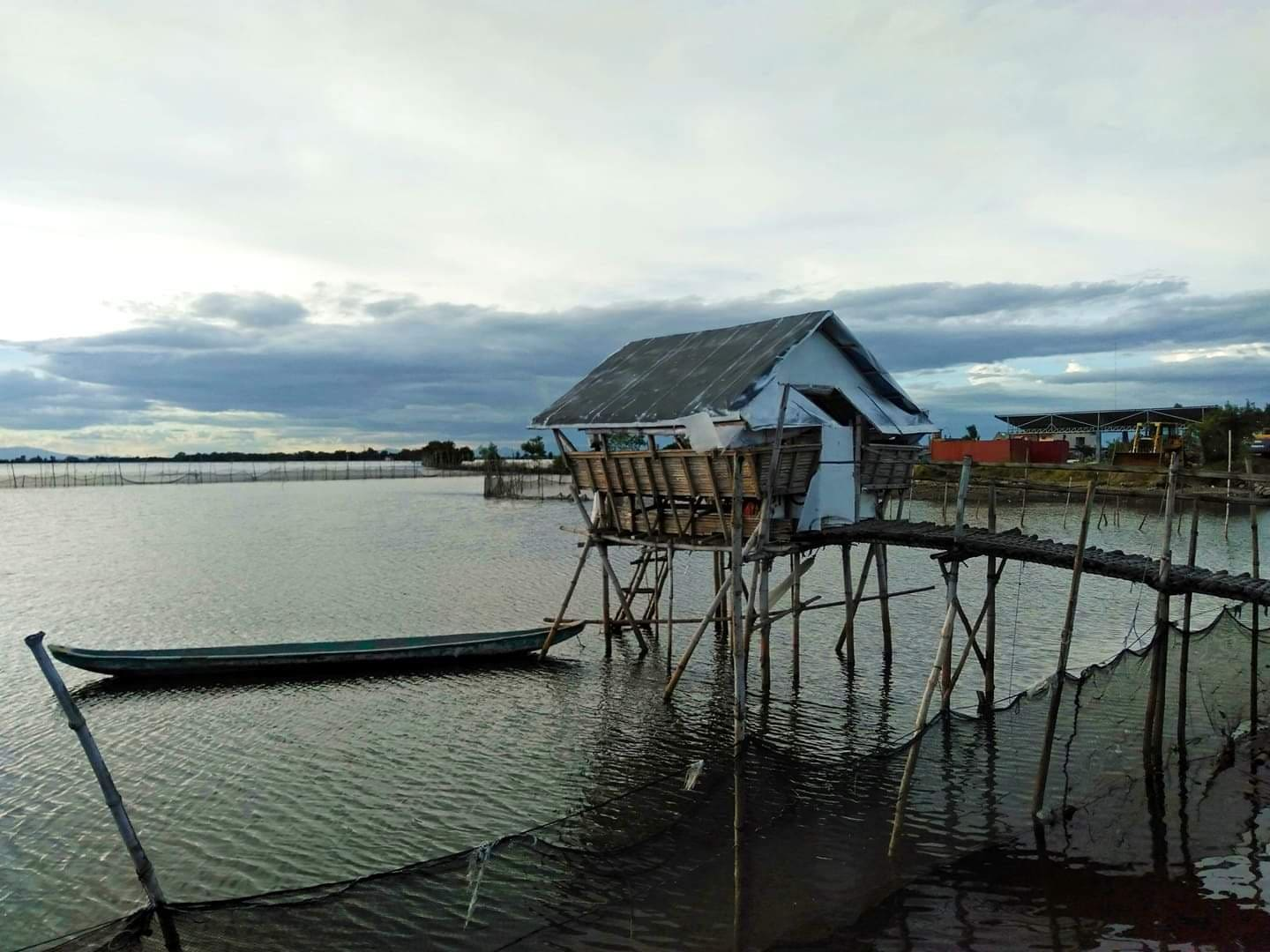
A fish pen in Meycauayan city

The Food and Agriculture Organization classifies the Philippine archipelago as a distinct basin that produces around 1.33% of global fish catch. As of 2015, fisheries made up 1.5% of GDP, employing 1.6 million people, and adding US$4.33 billion to the economy. At this time, the Philippines had the 8th largest national fishery. In 2020, fisheries made up 12.27% of agricultural gross value added, and 1.52% of national GDP. There were 4.35 million MT of seafood produced in 2018, 2.06% of global production. This went up to 4.42 million MT (worth PHP 281.65 billion) in 2019, and slightly down to 4.40 million MT (PHP 273.49 billion) in 2020. These 2020 changes were due to a decrease in aquaculture and municipal fisheries, despite an increase in commercial fisheries.

The most productive region in 2020 was Bangsamoro, which made up 21.7% (954,060.15 MT) of national production. However, much of this was seaweed, and other regions had an overall higher value output. In 2022, seaweed was the highest-produced product by volume, with 1,544,959.98 MT produced, compared to the 475,313.47 of tuna produced. However, the tuna production was worth PHP 54.32 billion, and the seaweed value of PHP 16,60 billion was less than many other fishery products.

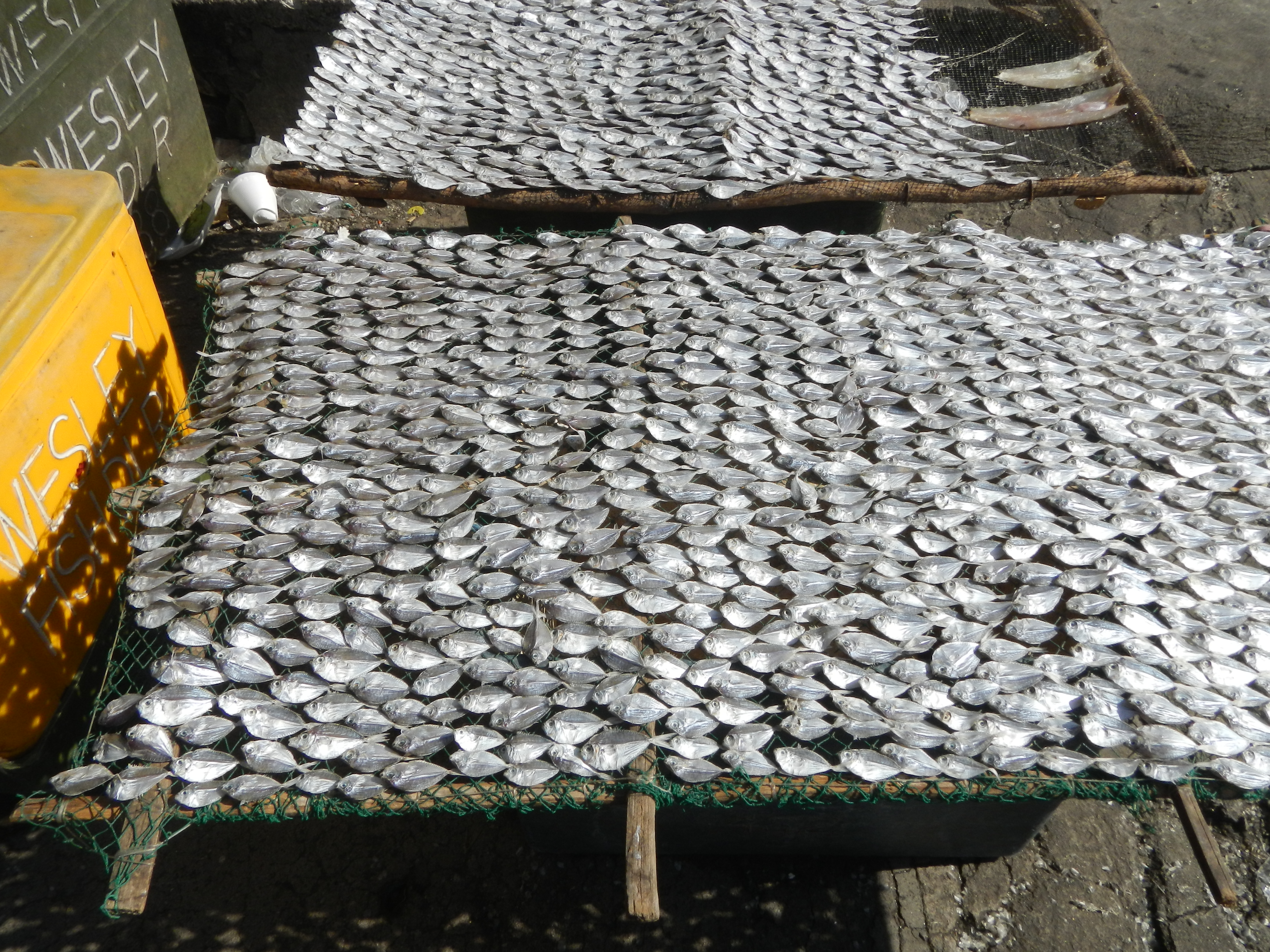
Fish being laid out to dry at a market in Mariveles

From 1980 to 2010 capture fisheries were dominant, making up 82% of fish volume caught, of which 89% was marine and 11% freshwater, although aquaculture has since increased in prominence. Municipal fisheries and aquaculture combined produced 73% of all catch from 2011 to 2020. From 2012 to 2021 aquaculture was far more productive than municipal fisheries, whose productivity was in turn slightly higher than that of commercial fisheries. In terms of value the difference was not as large. The average production of marine capture fisheries increased from 1.32 million MT per year in the 1980s, to 1.68 million in the 1990s, and 2.08 in the 2000s. In 2018, 1.89 million MT were caught, 2% of the global total. Inland capture fisheries produced 160 thousand MT in 2018, about 1% of the global inland catch.

Most catch is sold in local markets or shipped to urban centers, with 70% sold fresh or chilled without further processing. Prices fluctuate throughout the year. Most processed and unprocessed catch is consumed domestically. Only a small amount of catch is frozen for export, mostly tuna loins, cephalopods, and shrimps. Calculations of fisheries values often miss small-scale consumption. Salted, dried, smoked, and fermented products can be produced by small-scale businesses, often family businesses. Frozen and canned products are processed by larger industries. The ornamental fish trade was worth over PHP 300 million in 2001, when it made up 1.4% of fisheries exports.

== International trade ==
Exports in 2022
Rank	Country	Exports (MT)	Exports (USD)	Exports (PhP)
1	United States	43,763	255,940,000	13,943,027,000
2	Japan	31,197	148,064,000	8,066,177,000
3	China	53,698	121,251,000	6,605,488,000
4	Germany	21,480	88,228,000	4,806,470,000
5	Netherlands	12,566	72,189,000	3,932,718,000
6	Spain	15,466	70,541,000	3,842,941,000
7	United Kingdom	11,728	51,599,000	2,811,004,000
8	Hong Kong	12,437	37,396,000	2,037,268,000
9	South Korea	4,441	35,706,000	1,945,163,000
10	Taiwan	9,412	27,539,000	1,500,243,000
11	Vietnam	7,680	26,326,000	1,434,159,000
12	Italy	4,949	21,335,000	1,162,304,000
13	Canada	4,814	18,768,000	1,022,414,000
14	Mexico	1,720	17,024,000	927,453,000
15	France	3,640	16,926,000	922,101,000
16	Australia	2,967	16,606,000	904,658,000
17	Thailand	5,031	15,819,000	861,797,000
18	Brazil	1,724	13,540,000	737,615,000
19	India	1,063	11,133,000	606,475,000
20	Belgium	1,922	10,488,000	571,340,000
Other countries		30,977	136,294,000	7,424,988,000
TOTAL		282,674	1,212,711,000	66,065,802,000

Fishery production is a growing component of the economy. While a greater volume of product is imported than exported, the value of exported products is higher, both in total and per unit weight. Canned tuna makes up the majority of tuna exports, while carrageenan makes up 94% of seaweed exports. The high value of some exports reduces their domestic availability, leading to some fish processing industries lacking raw materials.

There is a small live fish trade, both ornamental and for food. This trade, particularly of leopard coral groupers and other groupers, is driven by demand from Hong Kong, Taiwan, and mainland China. The live food trade usually uses hook-and-line techniques, but the use of cyanide fishing is also known. Data is limited, but it is thought the catch of live fish was around 200,000 kilograms (440,000 lb) in 1994 and 800,000 kilograms (1,800,000 lb) in 1997, of which 95% was exported, although this period also saw localized declines. At least 23 other food species are known to have been caught for live export, mostly other groupers of the Serranidae family. The trade is dominated by companies that collect the fish from the provinces and move them to Manila for export.

In 2022, PHP 66.07 billion (US$1.21 billion) of fisheries-related products were exported, while PHP 50.14 billion (US$920.46 million) were imported. Most exports were tuna, seaweed, and crab, which together made up 58.36% of exports by volume and 69.61% by value. Other exports include eel, octopus, grouper, milkfish, shrimp, cuttlefish, and sardines. Tuna exports were 106,923 MT worth US$403.51 million. Seaweed exports were 48,491 MT, exported to the United States, the Netherlands, Spain, Germany, and China. Crab exports were 9,156 MT worth US$91,440. While crab exports by volume were mostly fresh or chilled crabs, crab products provided higher value. The main export markets for crabs were Hong Kong, China, the United States, and Taiwan. Shrimp exports are 90% frozen produce, mostly going to Japan, the United States, and South Korea.

Of fishery-related imports, which consist both of fish products for consumption, and products intended for other purposes, such as fish feed and shells. Over 40% of imports were tuna, with other imports including mackerel, sardines, and prawn. A quarter of imports come from China, one-fifth from Papua New Guinea, and one-eighth from Vietnam, with other sources including Japan, Taiwan, South Korea, Thailand, and Nauru. Tuna import and re-export is a major component of this trade. There are six tuna canneries in General Santos and one in Zamboanga. In addition, there are two Philippine-owned tuna canneries in Papua New Guinea (in Madang and Lae).

== Impact ==
=== Consumption and nutrition ===
Average daily seafood consumption in 2018 and 2019
	Individual (g)	Household (g)
Fresh fish	32.21 ± 1.25	231.46 ± 6.73
Processed fish	3.43 ± 0.18	48.15 ± 3.07
Shellfish	3.58 ± 0.25	30.83 ± 2.70

Over 70% of the population lives near the coast, and consumption of seafood has increased as the population has grown. Seafood provides over 40% of average consumed animal protein (or over 18% of all protein). In 2011 per capita consumption averaged 32.7 kg. In 2022, consumption was 34.27 kg (93.9 grams per day), of which 23.36 kg (64g) was fresh fish, 4.97 kg (13.6g) was processed fish, 2.85 kg (7.8g) was dried fish, and 3.10 kg (8.5g) was crustaceans and mollusks.

Domestic consumption is mostly tilapia, roundscand, and milkfish. Fresh fish consumption increases with income level, while processed fish income decreases. These consumption patterns are found in both urban and rural areas, although the specific species eaten may differ. While milkfish and tilapia are among the most commonly consumed species, they are less nutritious than many wild-caught species, with less protein, calcium, Vitamin A, Omega-3, iron, and selenium. Tilapia and roundscad are relatively cheap, while milkfish is consumed despite commanding a higher price than other less eaten commodities. There may be slightly more fish eaten in the south than in the north.

The increase in commercial fishing and the collapse of municipal fishing have contributed to malnourishment, and for species where both fisheries compete, more are now caught by the commercial sector. The average price of many species has increased over time. As wild stocks are declining, overall fisheries production is reliant on aquaculture, and thus greatly affected by changes in government funding, water quality, and disease.

=== Socioeconomics ===
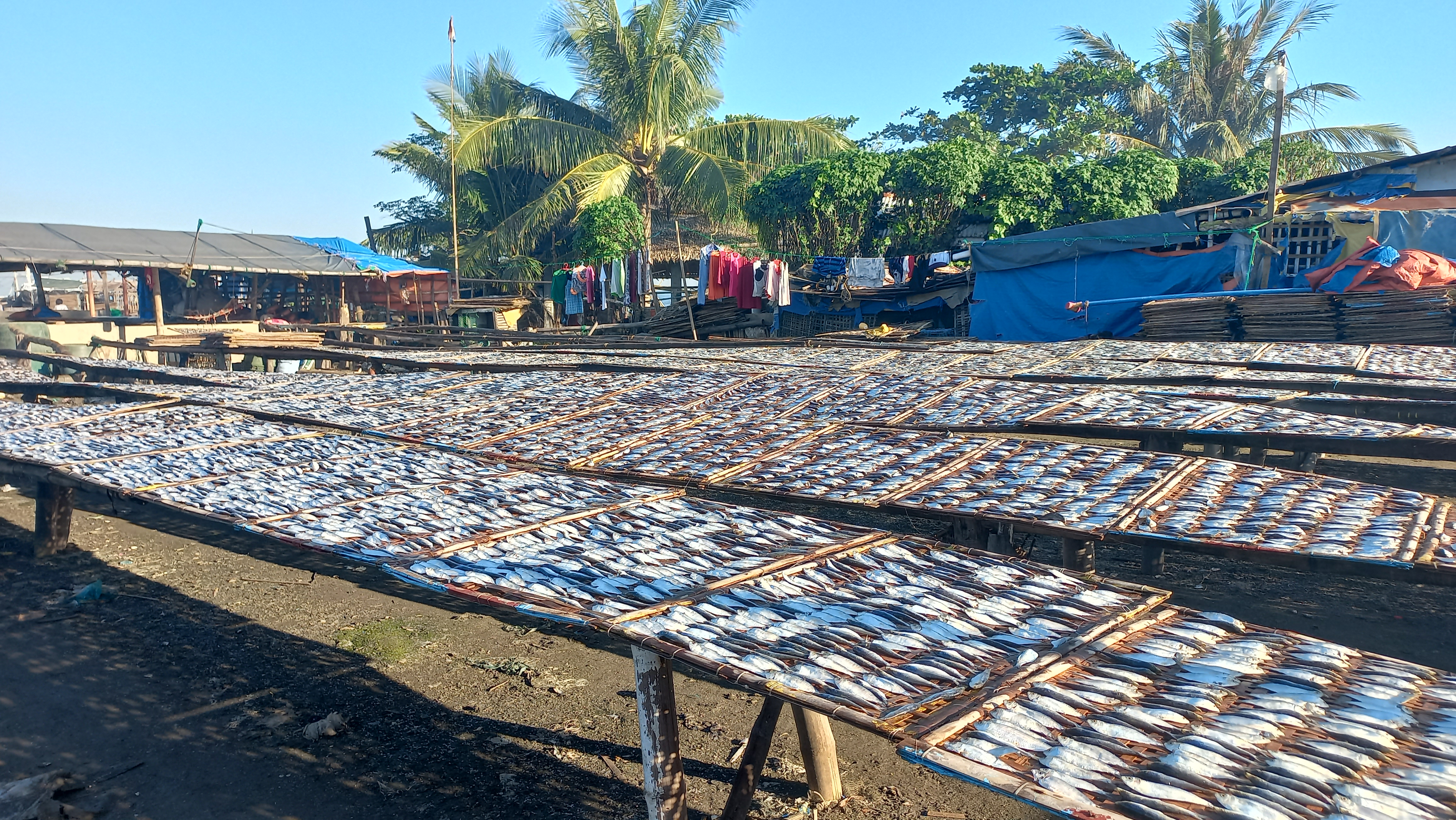
Sardines from Manila Bay drying in Rosario, Cavite

Fisheries play a key role in the economy and livelihoods, and are culturally considered a fallback option for those in need. Different government departments have come up with different employment figures for the different fishery sectors, and for the overall workforce. As of 2022, BFAR reported that there were 2,302,648 people involved in some stage of the fishing industry, of which 1,173,381 were involved in capture fishery and 259,448 in aquaculture. These were predominantly male. 257,511 were involved in gleaning, 157,161 in sales, and 45,148 in processing. These areas are female-dominated. Wild fisheries employ more people than aquaculture, within which municipal fisheries directly employ around 50 times more people than commercial fisheries, although there is overlap and commercial fisheries employment is likely an undercount.

Fisherfolk remain a relatively poor community. This is partially due to declining catches, with average daily income decreasing from the equivalent of 20 kilograms (44 lb) of fish in the 1970s to 2 kilograms (4.4 lb) in 2000. The extent of this decline varies, being particularly pronounced in some areas. It is estimated that 80% of all fisherfolk are artisanal, whose small-scale makes them vulnerable to natural disasters such as typhoons. Artisanal fishing is the second lowest-paid occupation after farming.

In 2018 average fisherfolk income was PHP 188,488.60 (PHP 15,707.38 a month). Fisherfolk poverty continuously decreased from 2006 to 2018. Municipal fisherfolk earn more on average that commercial fishing employees, although both are highly variable. For all, average income is below PHP 500 (around USD 10). In 2021, fisherfolk income in Metro Manila averaged PHP 25,752.50, and was lowest in Bangsamoro where the average was PHP 12,894.17. The overall decrease in poverty during the 2010s reversed in 2021 when 30.6% were considered in poverty. Households headed by a fisher spent proportionally more on food, alcohol, and tobacco than the average household. They are also larger than average while being less educated and having less access to water, sanitation, and electricity.

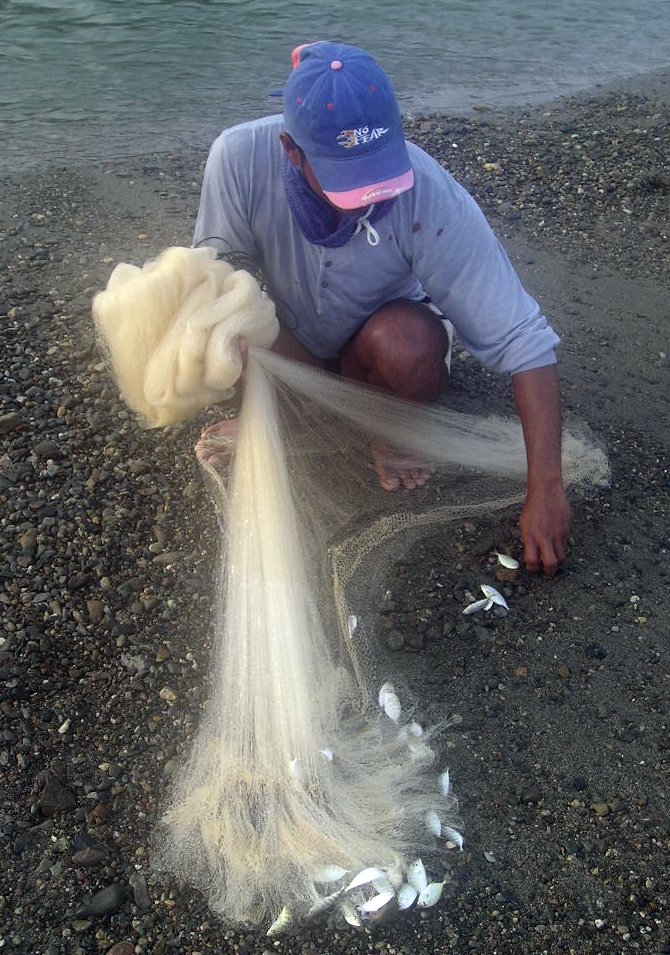
Small fish caught in Claveria, Cagayan

As fisheries have depleted, fisherfolk have had to travel further away from the shore, which means the cost of catching each fish is higher. Decreasing fish populations have occurred alongside increasing coastal human populations. Small margins means that fisherfolk are vulnerable to rising oil prices, as it is common for around 80% of income to be spent on fuel. Government interventions have aimed at providing alternative livelihoods and improving fisheries management.

The development of more productive fisheries created social stratification, with commercial fishing boat owners of a higher class than their employed laborers and those in small-scale fisheries. Fishing is difficult. Trips can involve a week in a lifeboat fishing at a single location while another boat comes every day or two to collect any catch. Few fisherfolk own their own boats. Commercial fishing operations benefit from subsidies and economies of scale. While commercial fisherfolk are meant to fish only outside of municipal waters (15 kilometres (9.3 mi) from the shore), there are some conflicts between municipal and commercial fisherfolk. Municipal and commercial fisheries often compete for the same fish stocks. Within a fishery, a small number of commercial boats owned by a small number of households can capture a lopsided amount of the available catch than the larger number of small-scale fisherfolk in the same area, and make greater profit from each catch. Large boats fishing the same payao (a type of fish aggregating device) as smaller boats may sometimes share a small amount of their catch. Trawling is known to destroy passive fishing equipment, such as fish traps.

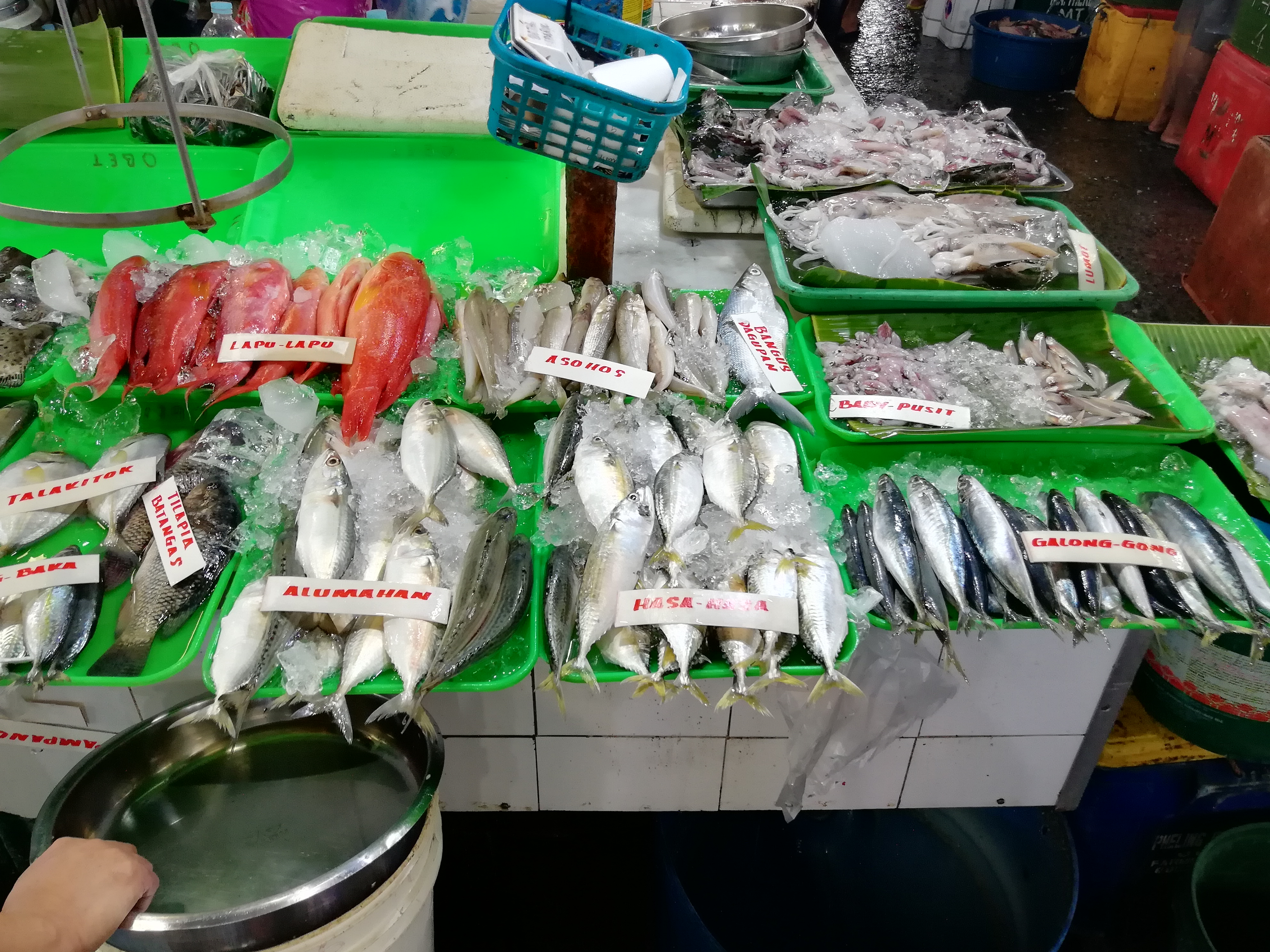
A fish market in Cubao, within the Metro Manila capital region

There is female participation in fishing and in fishing boat ownership, as well as in related roles such as gathering fry, preparing and repairing gear, processing catches, and marketing. Women often serve as middlemen, buying fish from ports and selling small amounts door-to-door. Where women are involved directly in fishing, it tends to be those inland or close to the coast. Women are often involved in fisheries management, being viewed as better at managing conflict. The low participation of women in those fishing from boats, 10%, results in women often being not included in statistics on fisherfolk. The catch of women is also more likely to be used directly for sustenance than that caught by men. Women may not be able to access markets of similar profitability to men, and are underrepresented in leadership positions. The collection of shellfish from the intertidal zone is generally carried out by women.

=== Environmental ===
Size at which fish species are considered mature
Name	Length
Giant trevally	95.4 cm (37.6 in)
Leopard coral grouper	62.9 cm (24.8 in)
Mangrove red snapper	54.6 cm (21.5 in)
Pink ear emperor	35.0 cm (13.8 in)
Frigate tuna	29.0 cm (11.4 in)
Whitesaddle goatfish	22.8 cm (9.0 in)
Rabbitfish	19.9 cm (7.8 in)
Shortfin scad	19.3 cm (7.6 in)
Honeycomb grouper	19.0 cm (7.5 in)
Silverbiddy	18.5 cm (7.3 in)
Indian mackerel	18.0 cm (7.1 in)
Lattice monocle bream	17.4 cm (6.9 in)
Northern whiting	17.0 cm (6.7 in)
Java parrotfish	16.3 cm (6.4 in)
Japanese scad	16.0 cm (6.3 in)
Short mackerel	15.7 cm (6.2 in)
Common parrotfish	15.5 cm (6.1 in)
Ornate threadfin bream	15.3 cm (6.0 in)
Moonfish	15.0 cm (5.9 in)
Little spinefoot	14.5 cm (5.7 in)
Goldband goatfish	14.6 cm (5.7 in)
Goldstripe sardinella	14.5 cm (5.7 in)
Yellowstripe scad	13.0 cm (5.1 in)
Bali sardinella	13.0 cm (5.1 in)
Indian anchovy	11.4 cm (4.5 in)
Splendid ponyfish	10.7 cm (4.2 in)
Fimbriated sardine	8.9 cm (3.5 in)
Commerson's anchovy	7.0 cm (2.8 in)

Human pressures occur alongside natural pressures such as those formed by the El Niño–Southern Oscillation. Catch rates in coral reef fisheries shrunk from over 10 kilograms (22 lb) a day in the 1950s to less than 5 kilograms (11 lb) in the 1990s. Both municipal and commercial fisheries are overfished, and mangrove areas are in decline. The causes for damage include dynamite fishing, cyanide fishing, bycatch, and fishing with small-gapped nets. Fish stocks in some areas are perhaps less than a tenth of what they were in the 1950s, and overall landings have been decreasing since 2010. Many sedentary and slow-moving, and thus easily harvested, invertebrate species have had local populations destroyed. The giant clam Hippopus porcellanus has been driven almost extinct, while Tridacna gigas and Tridacna derasa are overharvested. Some inland fisheries have been significantly overfished. The sinarapan, which may be the smallest commercially harvested fish, was driven almost extinct by overfishing in Lake Buhi. Gobiopterus lacustris has been almost wiped out of Laguna de Bay. The introduced tilapia species have outcompeted local species in many lakes.

Bycatch in crab gillnets can reach up to 45% of the catch, and much is thrown out. Of the crabs caught, around 3 of every 10 caught are immature, and 1 or 2 are egg-bearing females. Gillnets in the Malampaya Sound have entangled dolphins, including the Irrawaddy dolphin. Up to a quarter of gillnets are lost each year, becoming ghost nets. Drift nets catch cetaceans and turtles, as do some other fishing methods, while dugong are known to become trapped in fish corrals. Some shrimp fishing is excepted from regulations prohibiting fine mesh nets. Perhaps 25-30% of initial catch is lost during processing, mostly within the commercial fishing sector due to a lack of cold storage.

== Management ==
=== Policy and legislation ===
Fishing is expressly meant to be managed through the precautionary principle to ensure ecosystem sustainability. Under the Constitution of the Philippines, marine resources are intended to be used exclusively by Filipinos. Laws to manage fisheries include the Republic Act (RA) 10654 amending the Fisheries Code of 1998 (RA 8550) which defines the role of the Bureau of Fisheries and Aquatic Resources (BFAR) in non-municipal waters, the Local Government Code of 1991 (RA 7160) which defines the roles of local government units in municipal waters, and the Agriculture and Fisheries Modernization Act of 1997 (RA 8435), which calls for the development of the fisheries sector to ensure food availability, create economies of scale, and create value-added products. The 1992 National Integrated and Protected Areas System (NIPAS) Act regulates national protected areas.

RA 8550 forms the basis of current fisheries law, replacing all prior law that might contradict it. The primary goal of this act was food security, and its balance of ecosystem protection and fishing allowance was intended to achieve long-term sustainability. Within the framework of this national law, fisheries management in municipal waters continues to be devolved to municipal authorities acting under the Local Government Code. Representing the private sector is the government-funded National Agricultural and Fisheries Council. Handline fishing is regulated by Republic Act 9379 (the Handline Fishing law), which creates a specific designation for fishing vessels using handline techniques. Labor standards are set by the Department of Labor and Employment.

The Wildlife Conservation and Protection Act of 2001 (RA 9147) mandates habitat use is sustainable. Together with Fisheries Administrative Order (FAO) 233-1 of 2010, it also promotes the protection of native species, including those important for fisheries. Other relevant acts include Memorandum Circular 2018–59 on Policies and Guidelines on the Regulation and Monitoring of Fishery Activities in Municipal Waters, FAO 155 on Regulating the use of fine-meshed nets in fishing (amended by FAO 155–1), FAO 198 on the Rules and Regulations on Commercial Fishing (amended by FAO 198-1 for the registration and licensing of commercial vessels, gears, and workers), FAO 201 on banning fishing with active gear in municipal waters, and FAO 223/BFAR Circular 253-1 which created a moratorium on licenses for new fishing gear for one year.

=== Jurisdiction and responsibility ===
The Department of Environment and Natural Resources (DENR) has responsibility for some aspects of coastal management, such as the sustainable management of mangrove forests, and monitoring pollution. DENR also provides technical support to local government units (LGUs) for aspects of coastal management that fall under the responsibility of LGUs. BFAR is responsible for managing fisheries resources outside of municipal waters, and also provides technical support to LGUs. DENR has a general responsibility for environmental protection in both coastal and marine environments, sharing responsibility with LGUs where relevant.

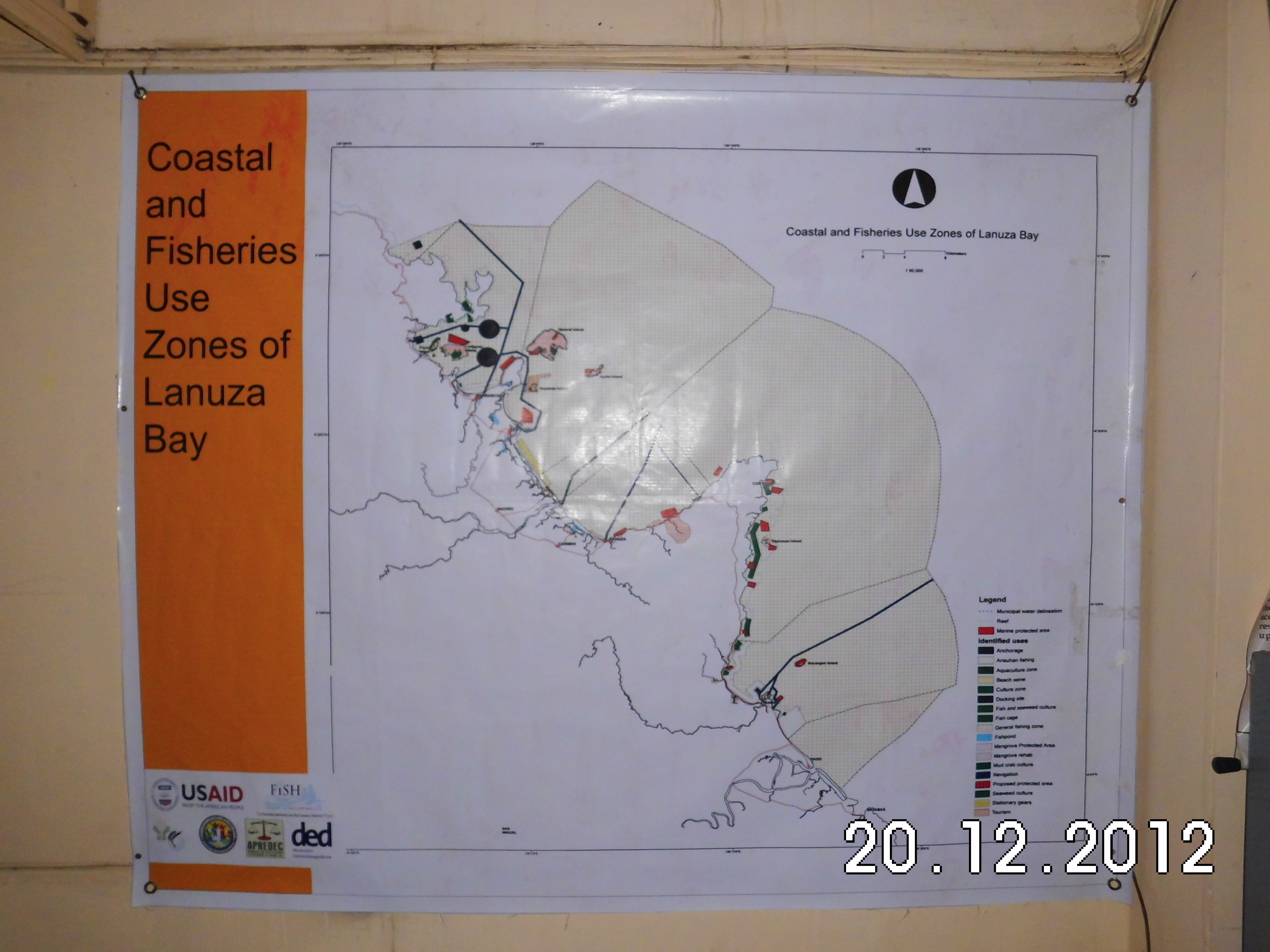
Coastal use zones of Lanuza Bay, showing marine protected areas, aquaculture spots, and general fishing zones

The Local Government Code charges LGUs with managing all licensing and fees for the municipal waters. Executive Order 305 charges LGUs with registering fishing vessels smaller than 3 gross MT. Some licensing is done at the barangay level. Each LGU is able to implement this in their own chosen manner. Due to this, many LGUs license on the basis of demand, rather than through evidence-based management principles. On the LGU level, the responsible bodies for legislation are the Sangguniang Bayan (in municipalities) or Sangguniang Panlungsod (in cities). Local laws must be in line with national laws and policy. Municipal authorities may pass regulations with more protection than those mandated by national law, but cannot regulate for weaker protections. LGUs issue Municipal Fisheries Ordinances to manage their waters. (Provincial governments coordinate municipalities, but do not exercise direct authority over fisheries.) Municipal waters are delineated by the National Mapping and Resource Information Authority. Although LGUs are responsible for registering municipal fisherfolk, BFAR has implemented programs to assist LGUs with this.

At municipal, provincial, and national levels, Fisheries and Aquatic Resource Management Councils (FARMCs) provide an institutional framework for local and national governments to cooperate with fisherfolk and other stakeholders. These were established through Executive Order 240, and later through FAO 196 from 2000 and its amendments. FARMCs can also be created at the barangay level. These councils are involved in the development of local government management policies for marine resources and in the issuance of fisheries licenses. As of 2022, 1,094 had been established.

Through FAOs, BFAR governs fisheries outside of municipal waters. BFAR has an office in each region, and in some LGUs. BFAR collects data centrally through its regional offices, while municipalities often create their own separate datasets. BFAR licenses commercial fishing vessels for fishing in national and international waters. Ships larger than 20 GT are required to have GPS tracking and satellite responders. BFAR also produces Fisheries Development Plans.

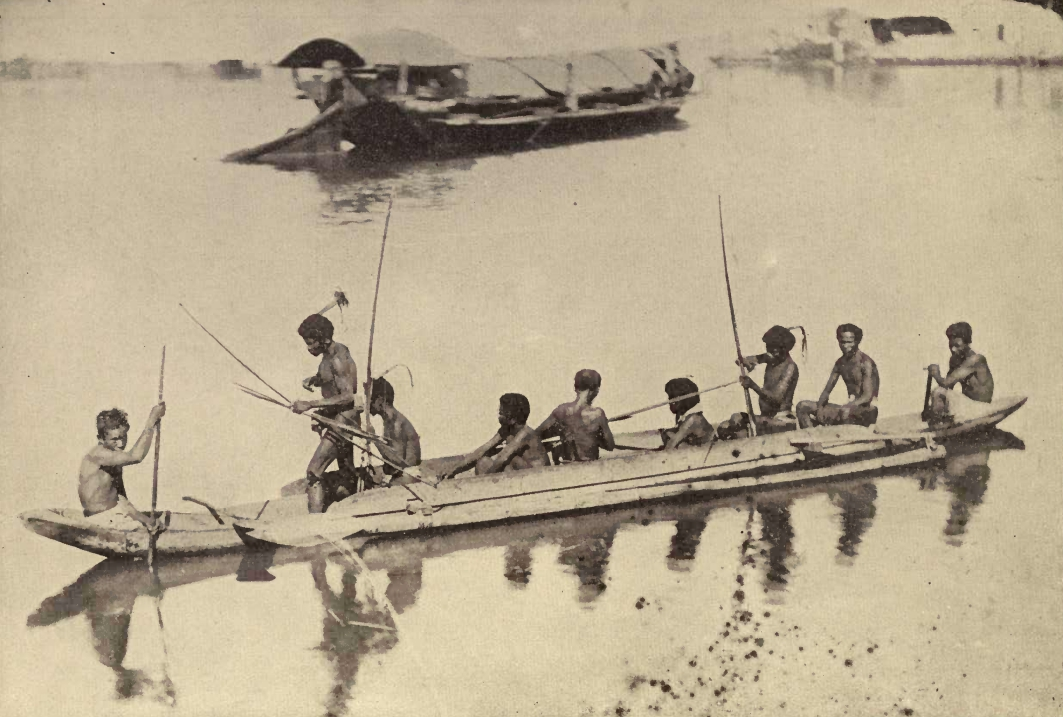
A negrito fishing boat in 1899

There are some special cases of fisheries management responsibility. Fisheries in Laguna de Bay are regulated by the Laguna Lake Development Authority. Municipal registration in Palawan is coordinated with the Palawan Council for Sustainable Development. Bangsamoro has its own fisheries powers. The Indigenous Peoples' Rights Act of 1997 allows indigenous groups to fish in recognized ancestral lands without registering, so long as they follow fishing regulations, while other fisherfolk require special consent to fish in these areas. Ports can be managed by the Philippine Ports Authority or by the LGU in which they are situated. The enforcement of laws is shared between many local and national bodies.

=== Techniques ===
Fisheries Management Areas (FMAs)
FMA	Area (km^{2})	2021 catch (MT)
FMA-01	505,345	116,256.62
FMA-02	300,098	98,813.42
FMA-03	166,659	744,069.92
FMA-04	152,076	1,012,736.62
FMA-05	485,417	434,436.11
FMA-06	293,930	473,459.51
FMA-07	16,699	133,954.79
FMA-08	14,090	40,430.16
FMA-09	28,228	161,258.80
FMA-10	15,265	105,388.05
FMA-11	20,386	242,647.90
FMA-12	36,674	132,635.33

Management tools included within the Fisheries Code of 1998 include harvest limits, vessel monitoring, compliance and penalty measures, fishing gear registration, and catch documentation. Other laws and ordinances delivered through means such as Fishery Administrative Orders or other executive decrees and instructions include those affecting technology (gear) legality and regulation, spatial restrictions, temporal restrictions, and commodity-specific regulations. Most management is area-based or temporal, limiting all operations within a certain space and/or timeframe, or regulated by species. While there are some municipal and commercial fishing licenses issued, the system is not comprehensive enough to function as a management tool.

Gear restrictions include national bans on fishing with explosives, poison, muro-ami nets, and flammable substances. There are minimum fishing net mesh sizes for different species, ranging from 1.9 cm (0.75 in) to 3.5 cm (1.4 in). In municipal waters, pa-aling nets, fishing light attractors of too high a wattage, and active gear (gear used by moving such as trawling) are banned.

Simple to establish, marine protected areas have become a common tool to protect coral reefs. While some are national parks, many are created through local and community processes. The Fisheries Code of 1998 calls for 15% of municipal waters to be protected, in addition to protected mangrove areas. These should be established and managed by LGUs in consultation with relevant FARMCs. National protected seascapes are established under the National Integrated Protected Areas System Act (RA 7586), and are managed by the DENR in collaboration with relevant LGUs. Some LGUs establish a number of separated small protected areas, for example one in each barangay. Marine protected areas are often no-take, banning all forms of fishing completely. However, local-level MPAs are often community-managed and thus accepted and supported by affected local communities, who also may participate in establishing MPA sizes and boundaries. Their ability to generate positive spillover effects, increasing fish stocks in the surrounding water, is also recognized by some communities. Some protected areas can also provide alternative livelihoods through ecotourism.

Many MPAs in the Philippines include both a core no-take area, and a surrounding area with regulated activities. Altogether, there are perhaps up to 1,800 marine protected areas of some kind in the country, where they are also known as Marine Sanctuaries, Marine Reserves, and Marine Parks. These have different levels of fishing restrictions, however, many lack effective enforcement, leading to low effectiveness. In addition to fishery protection, they provide alternative livelihood opportunities relating to tourism, as well as generating community pride. The large number of MPAs mean some form networks of protected areas.

Closed seasons
Target	Location	Period	Legislation
Sardines, herring, mackerel	Visayan Sea	November 15 – March 15	FAO 167 (1989)
Sardines	Zamboanga Peninsula (East Sulu Sea, Basilan Strait, Sibuguey Bay)	December 1 – March 1	Joint DA-DILG Administrative Order No. 1 (2011); Reaffirmed in BFAR Circular 255 (2014)
Small pelagic species	Davao Gulf	June 1 – August 31	Joint DA-DILG Administrative Order 2 (2014)
Roundscad	Calamian Islands	November 1 – January 31	Joint DA-DILG Administrative Order 1 (2015)

Closed seasons for specific species are enabled by the Philippine Fisheries Code. A November 15 to March 15 closed season for sardines, herring, and mackerel in parts of the Visayan Sea was mandated by FAO 167 in 1989, building on past law for this area stretching back to 1939. Enforcement only became significant in 2012, following a 24% decline in catch from 2010 to 2011. The November to March period coincides with the spawning period of these species. While evidence for its impact is lacking, a later closed season established in Zamboanga saw catches increase. There is a similar policy in the Cagayan River to protect lobed river mullet, which was established through FAO 31 of 1952. One closed season in the Davao Gulf is targeted specifically at commercial fishing, allowing employees on commercial ships to fish in smaller boats during the closure period.

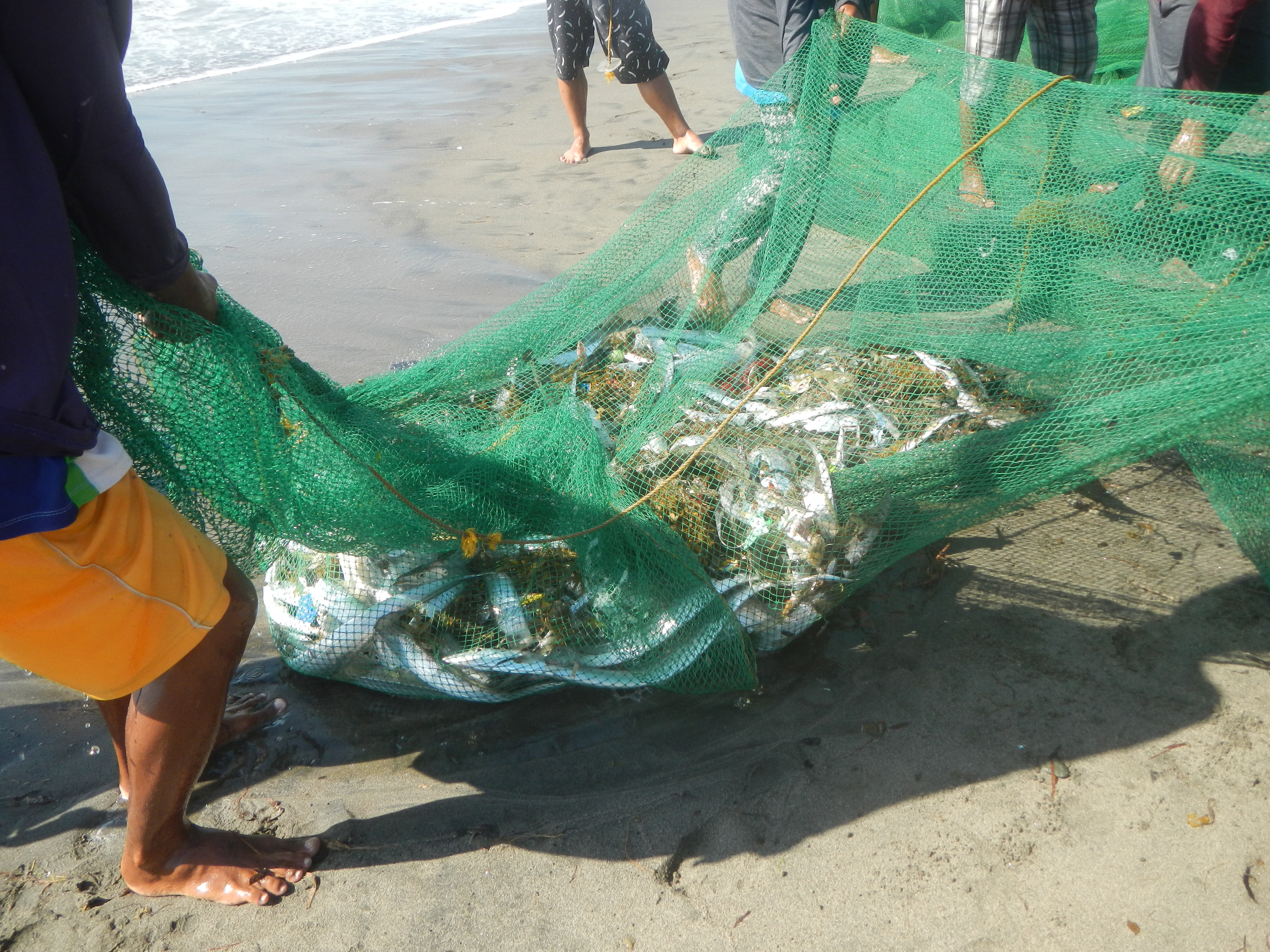
Fishing with a beach seine

On the local level, closed seasons may be imposed on municipal waters by their LGU in consultation with the local FARMC. Local governments are also able to use other tools, such as establishing MPAs, imposing fees, and regulating gear use. Local management often takes place through an integrated coastal management approach that accounts for different species and stakeholders. Opposition to the 1986 ban of muro-ami fishing led to the development of a modified method, pa-aling, which was restricted to certain areas and monitored. The use of kayakas, essentially smaller muro-ami, was also banned. There are efforts in various places around the country to restore giant clam populations through artificial seeding. From December 2011 to February 2012 the fishing of Sardinella was banned. Species-level restrictions may also be more nuanced, for example banning the capture of full-sized breeding milkfish. The establishment of marine protected area and closed seasons helps conserve target populations but also interrupts livelihoods.

Giving LGUs responsibilities for fishery management has historically complicated the management of transboundary ecosystems. Since 2019 Philippine waters have been divided into 12 Fisheries Management Areas (FMAs) plus a special fisheries management area covering parts of Benham Rise. This system allows for local differentiation in fishing rules and regulations. Each area is expected to have its own management body and scientific advisory group, which will prepare a Fisheries Management Area Plan that is responsive to its particular needs. In addition to creating more tailored sustainability plans, the FMAs are intended to improve governance and the enforcement of fishery laws and regulations. However, due to a lack of data, the FMA borders may not be aligned with fish stocks.

=== Implementation and enforcement ===
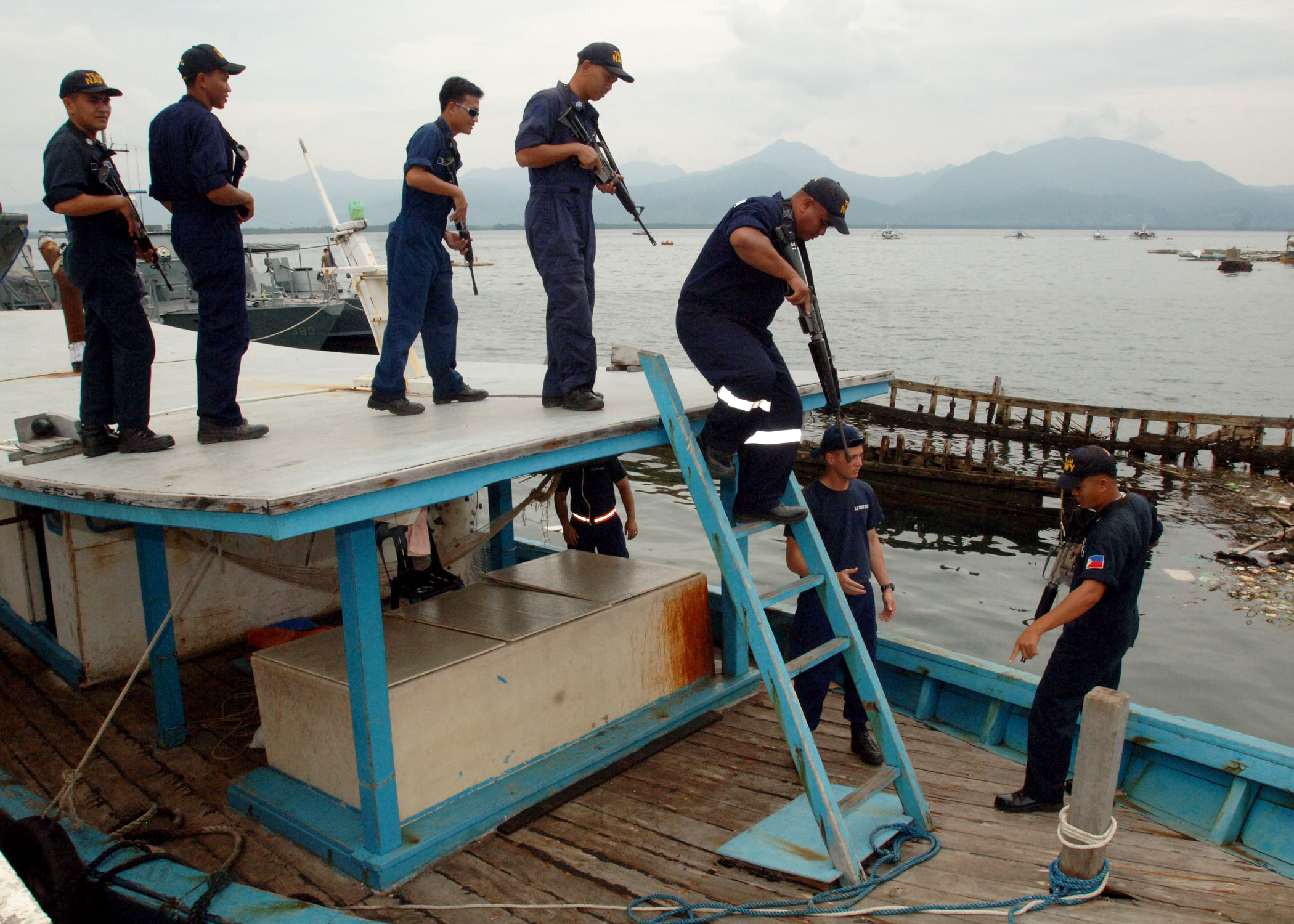
Philippine Navy sailors practicing boarding a fishing ship

Effective fisheries management remains a challenge due to the many interlocking factors affecting fisheries, and diverse bodies responsible for enforcement. Effective administration requires additional political will, human capital, and financial capital. This is especially true at the local government level, where capacity is highly variable. The small scale of most fishery activities impedes monitoring and regulation. Data collection is particularly difficult for municipal fisheries, as municipal fishing boats are not well-monitored. Similarly, catch that is not landed in official ports and distributed locally is missed by official statistics. The real production from municipal fisheries may be 14% higher than the data shows. Boats registered as commercial vessels may not be large enough or properly equipped to fish those waters, leading to unprevented illegal fishing in municipal waters. Local governments responsible for registering municipal fishing vessels often do not seriously enforce compliance. An estimated 30-47% of municipal fishing boats were not registered in 2019.

While the Philippines has a well-developed system of environmental laws with judicial support, it faces a consistent challenge in implementation and enforcement. The prevention of illegal, unreported and unregulated fishing (IUU fishing) is well established within fisheries legislation, being the key focus of the Philippine Fisheries Code of 1998. BFAR tracks fishery patrols, apprehensions, and fines related to IUU fishing. It is difficult to get definite data on the impact of IUU fishing, but it is estimated it may affect up to 27-40% of marine capture fisheries. Around 274,000-422,000 MT are estimated to be caught but unreported, perhaps 80,000-125,000 municipal fishing vessels are thought to be unregistered, and 1,600-2,700 commercial fishing vessels are thought to be either unregistered or registered as municipal fishing vessels.

BFAR organizes its response through a Fisheries Law Enforcement Operations Action Plan, although there is no centralized record of patrol data. From 2015 to 2017 BFAR filed 1,026 cases, mostly for incidents within municipal fisheries and closed waters, likely the most monitored areas. The most common violations filed for were unauthorized fishing, using gear inappropriate for municipal fisheries, and unlicensed employees. Despite observed widespread occurrence, only 30 cases were filed for illegal chemical or explosive use, and only 5 for poaching. The Philippine Coast Guard and Philippine Navy separately carry out monitoring and enforcement, making their own arrests. This institutional setup creates overlapping rules, regulations, and areas of responsibility. These may complicate implementation and enforcement efforts, however they also provide multiple avenues for enforcement.

Management at the local level is often hampered by a lack of capacity, political will, enforcement, and transparency. LGUs receive some funds from the national government and have their own revenue-generating powers, which include revenues generated through their management of municipal waters. However, management of fisheries competes with other priorities and is often underfunded. National funding formulas take into account land area but not water area. Imposing fees on municipal water exploitation may produce political backlash. Compliance is often affected by community and fisherfolk acceptance, as well as by the design of the regulation and the attention paid to enforcement measures. Adhering to closed seasons is particularly challenging for subsistence fisherfolk with no alternative livelihood options. The duration of the Visayan sea closed season was reduced from four months to three in 2013 due to low compliance. Similarly, dynamite fishing has been hard to prohibit due to the perception that it does not harm others, especially compared to the harm observed through legal fishing means such as trawling. Protections against marine wildlife such as dolphins are sometimes ignored as dolphins are seen as competitors. Enforcement for MPAs is patchy, with as few as 16% seeing strict enforcement, although designated areas are preserved better than other areas.

Commercial fisheries illegally operating in municipal waters have reduced catches in many coastal areas. This can be hard to police, especially when faced with a lack of political will or funding. Community-based law enforcement thus supplements government enforcement activities. This can fill gaps left when LGUs are unable to carry out enforcement and national bodies cannot or will not assume responsibility, but actions such as citizen arrests do face the risk of countersuits. Under a program known as Bantay dagat local fishermen are encouraged to report illegal fishing activities.

=== Management plans and international cooperation ===
Fisheries Plans and Their Durations
Plan	Duration
Comprehensive National Fisheries Industry Development Plan (CNFIDP)	2006–2025 (Latest: 2021–2025)
National Wetlands Action Plan	2011–2016
National Plan of Action to Prevent, Deter, and Eliminate IUU Fishing	2013–Present
Fisheries Law Enforcement Operations Action Plan (FAO 271 of 2018)	2019–2023
National Sardines Management Plan	2020–2025

A number of government plans and policies have been put in place to improve fishery sustainability, enhance aquaculture, and tackle IUU fishing. The Philippines ratified UNCLOS in 1984, and is also party to the United Nations Fish Stocks Agreement, the FAO Compliance Agreement, the Convention on Biological Diversity, CITES, the Convention on the Conservation of Migratory Species of Wild Animals, some World Trade Organization agreements (such as the General Agreement on Tariffs and Trade), and the Port State Measures Agreement. Such international treaties ratified by the Philippine Congress become part of Philippine law.

The Philippines is a member of the Western and Central Pacific Fisheries Commission, the Indian Ocean Tuna Commission, the International Commission for the Conservation of Atlantic Tunas, and the Coral Triangle Initiative. USAID has cooperated on many fisheries projects in the country. The Philippines is a cooperating non-member of the Commission for the Conservation of Southern Bluefin Tuna. Bilateral fisheries cooperation efforts have been undertaken with Papua New Guinea, Vietnam, Indonesia, and Thailand. The Philippines engages in multilateral talks within ASEAN, the Asia-Pacific Fishery Commission, the Coral Triangle Initiative, the Asia-Pacific Economic Cooperation, and with the parties of the Nauru Agreement.

=== Research ===
The Philippine Council for Aquatic and Marine Research and Development coordinates government fisheries research. BFAR operates the National Fisheries Research and Development Institute, and the Philippine Council for Agriculture, Aquatic, and Natural Resources Research and Development provides some research funding and coordination on behalf of the Department of Science and Technology and the Bureau of Agricultural Research (under the Department of Agriculture.

Research universities include the University of the Philippines Visayas, the Marine Science Institute of the University of the Philippines, Central Luzon State University, and Mindanao State University. BFAR runs a scholarship program for a Bachelor of Fisheries. Research into sustainability has mostly focused on small-scale fisheries in Luzon and the Visayas, with comparatively less research having taken place for commercial fisheries and in Mindanao. The Southeast Asian Fisheries Development Center carries out aquaculture research in Iloilo. Research and management cooperation is undertaken with nearby states, including Indonesia, Malaysia, and Vietnam, and within ASEAN.

=== Threats ===
Philippine fisheries face a mixture of environmental, socioeconomic, and institutional challenges. Environmental damage to fisheries habitats has occurred alongside fishery depletion. Coral reef quality has degraded across the country, and by 2014 no coral reefs in the country had 75% or more of their area covered by live coral. The protection of coral reefs and their associated ecosystem benefits, including supporting municipal fishing, is a critical aspect of Philippine food security. Half of all mangroves have been lost, in part due to direct conversion to aquaculture. Mangrove deforestation harms local fisheries, as mangrove presence increases fish production. At least half of all seagrass beds have been degraded or lost. Invasive fish species have caused some damage to local ecosystems, however the strictly economic value of these species has outweighed these losses.

Red tides and fish kill events are an issue, and fisheries face significant risk from natural disasters. Environmental damage occurs through soil erosion, water pollution, and direct habitat destruction. Boat discharge and eutrophication have damaged coastal ecosystems, especially sensitive seagrass. Mariculture also introduces nutrient pollution into the water that can lead to fish kills. Water quality varies throughout the year. A rise in shipping has also increased pollution.

Climate change is likely to damage the country's fisheries, slowing the growth of the industry compared to current conditions. Its effect is likely to differ between species, for example heavily impacting anchovies and tuna. It is also expected to decrease income among those who might purchase fish. Typhoons and other tropical storms can be highly destructive for small-scale fisherfolk, destroying their property and damaging communal infrastructure such as ports they rely on. They also reduce the number of safe fishing days. High temperatures are damaging coral reef ecosystems, and shifting fish stocks away from tropical waters.

Socioeconomic challenges have occurred as decreasing incomes and inequitable resource access have exacerbated poverty and created resource conflicts. Overfishing affects all commonly fished species. This means increasing effort is needed to catch the same amount of fish, although exceptions exist around historically less fished waters around parts of Palawan, Mindanao, and the east coast. The amount of fish caught often exceeds maximum sustainable yields. The impact of fishery decline has been particularly impactful on municipal fisherfolk. Fishing vessels have had to move further out to sea as nearshore fisheries became depleted. The overexploitation of demersal fisheries through trawling has occurred since at least the 1960s, with some stocks now almost wiped out. In addition to an overall loss of up to 90% of overall biomass, demersal ecosystems has also seen their species composition altered. Trawl catch per hour has declined over time. In total, perhaps 75% of all fisheries are depleted.

Over time, the percentage of fish caught that are larger species has decreased. The use of payao sees the capture of large numbers of juvenile tuna, with individuals under a year old making up to 90% of catches in some cases, which has affected tuna migration and feeding behaviors. Squid have also been widely caught in juvenile stages. In some areas, juveniles are deliberately caught, a process which not only weakens populations but can cause considerable by-catch.

Destructive and illegal fishing practices include compressor fishing, spearfishing, and blast fishing. One study in 2000 estimated blast fishing activities generating US$170 million over 20 years would cause US$1,640 million in environmental damage. In some places, increasing environmental awareness and the depletion of fish stocks has resulted in a decrease in blast fishing. Cyanide fishing was thought to be used by perhaps 4,000 individuals as of 2013. A USAID study estimated that LGUs lost 3,000-9,500 MT of fish to IUU activities each year.

The live fish trade for food sees the use of cyanide fishing to capture fish. It has also had a direct impact on leopard coral grouper populations. This species is slow-growing, and its exploitation has been linked to localized decreases in average body size. The ornamental fish trade also uses cyanide fishing to capture live fish. While as of 2004 there were only a small number of studies on the trade, it is thought to have a high localized impact on target species, such as the whitetail dascyllus, especially as the mortality rate of caught fishes may reach 80%.

Disputes with China have reduced the ability of Filipino fisherfolk to access fisheries in the South China Sea. Illegal fishing by foreign vessels in Philippine waters has been observed, including by vessels from China, Indonesia, and Taiwan.

== History ==
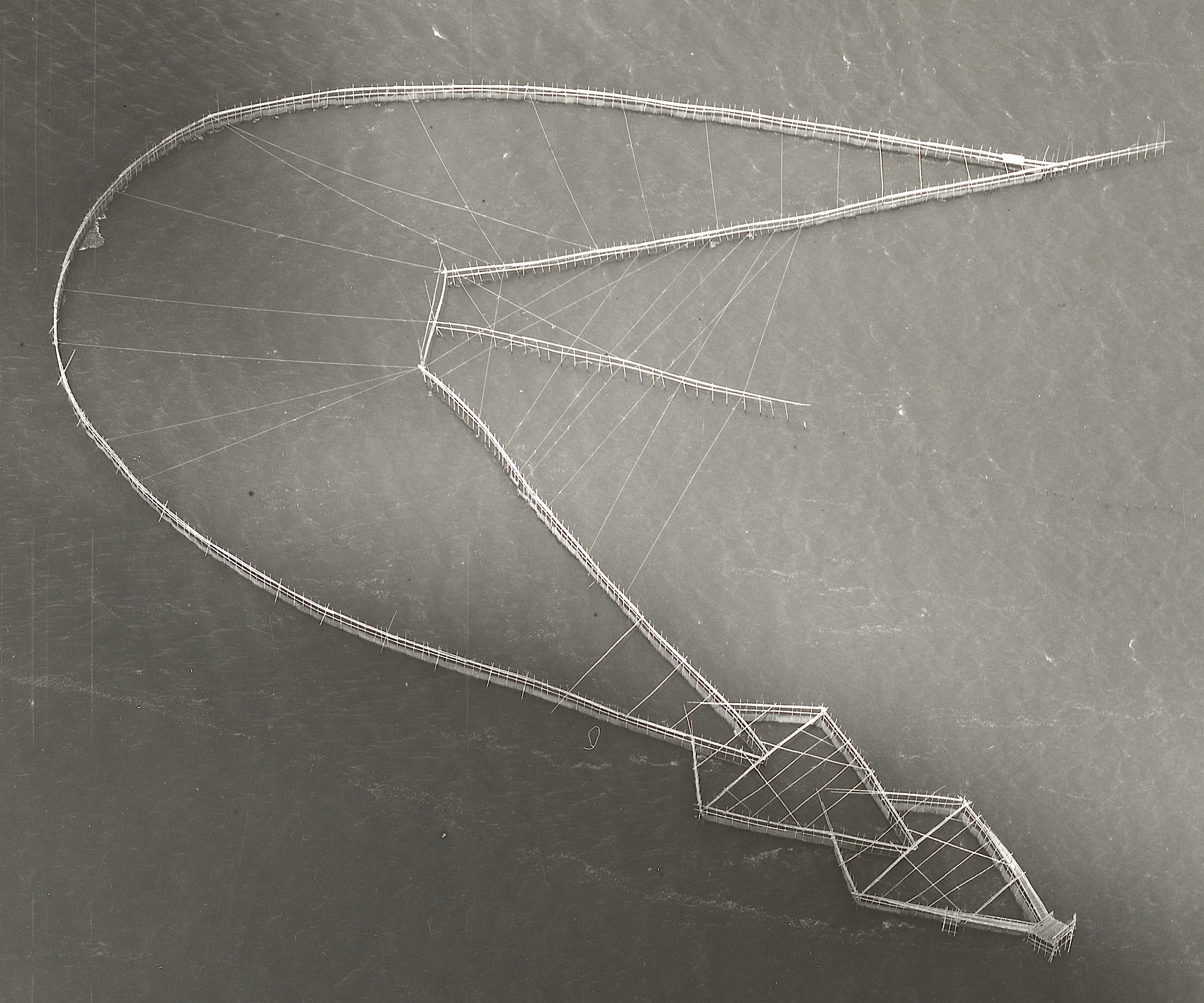
A fish trap in Manila Bay in 1933

What is now the Philippines has a long history of coastal fishing communities, with control of coastal resources likely exercised by barangay chiefs. During Spanish rule the Spanish Law of Waters assigned control of all coastal resources to the Manila authorities, and Chinese immigration introduced new fishing equipment. The first farmed fish is thought to be milkfish, collected from tidal waters and raised in brackish ponds. Population growth during American rule in the early 20th century increased demand, which was partially met by new technology. Large towns developed whose economy was based upon fishing. The Fisheries Act of 1932 (Act 4003) created the concept of municipal waters.

After World War II, the rapid development and adoption of new technology greatly increased fishing intensity. By the mid-1960s, production was double what it had been in 1951. Some fisheries in Manila Bay were likely already close to being overfished during the 1950s. Demersal fisheries peaked in the late 1960s in most areas. The first provincial trawling ban was issued in 1954, and in 1983 trawling was banned within shallow coastal waters nationwide. The technological development of the industry benefited existing capital holders, and commercial production soon began to outstrip the previously dominant municipal fisheries. Capture fisheries grew steadily until the mid-1970s, and grew again from the mid-1980s to the 1990s. While municipal catches decreased during parts of this period, increasing commercial catches compensated for this.

The mid-1970s saw the introduction of payao, which made tuna fisheries the most valuable in the country. Presidential Decree 704 of 1975 promoted the exploitation of fisheries, although environmental problems were becoming apparent, and the government began to tentatively look into coastal management near the end of that decade. During the 1970s, fisherfolk incomes declined. Commercial operations outcompeted small-scale fisherfolk exploiting the same fisheries, further diminishing the already shrinking fish stocks available. Municipal fishery production dropped to just 30% of the total. The capture of small pelagic fish plateaued after 1975. The 1970s saw the first coastal resource management programs aimed at promoting sustainability, and the 1980s saw a shift in management responsibilities from the national government towards local governments. The Sumilon Marine Reserve was set up in 1974, and Presidential Proclamation 1801 established the broader concept of marine reserves in 1978. The introduction of Nile tilapia in the 1970s enabled freshwater aquaculture to become commercially profitable.

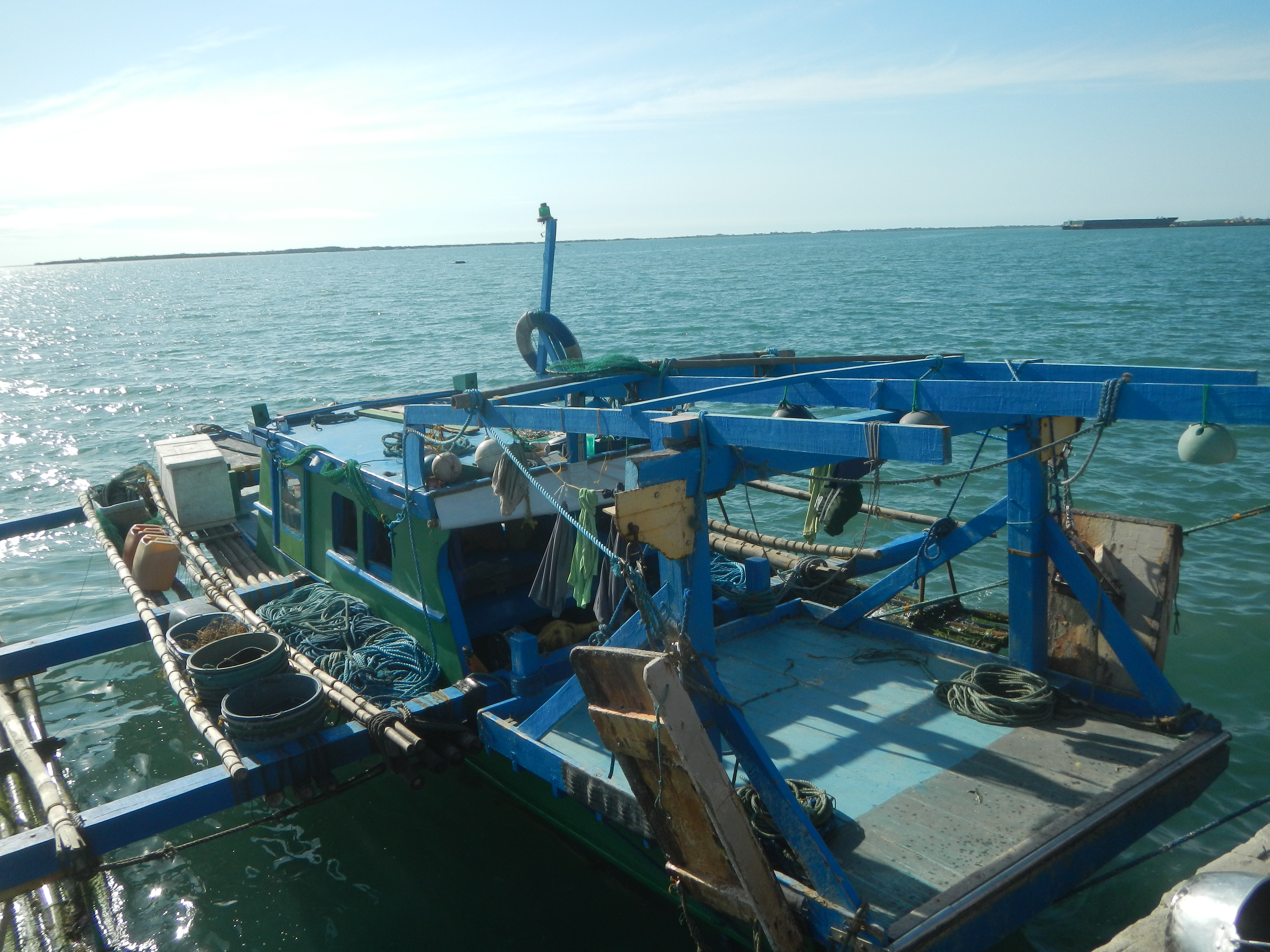
A fishing boat in Santo Tomas, La Union, near the Agoo–Damortis Protected Landscape and Seascape

The 1987 constitution included a specific reference to the "preferential use" of fishing resources by "subsistence fishermen". The Local Government Code of 1991 extended municipal waters from 7 kilometres (4.3 mi) to 15 kilometres (9.3 mi), shifting commercial fishing further from the shore. In 1998, fisheries laws were entirely overhauled through Republic Act 8550 (the Fisheries Code of 1998), which replaced all former laws and became the basis of further legislation going forward. The Fisheries Code of 1998 assigned management of municipal waters fully to local governments, with the intention that their exploitation be mostly restricted to the residents of their municipality. The code also reinforced the concept of integrated coastal management, the importance of local management, and the inclusion of community stakeholders in fisheries management. The formation of Fisheries and Aquatic Resources Management Councils was mandated, to facilitate local engagement in municipal lawmaking.

With overfishing remaining an acute issue in the 2000s, many local governments implemented integrated coastal management, treating fisheries as part of a wider system alongside marine protected areas. Integrated coastal management was officially adopted as a national strategy in 2006. In 2019, the Bureau of Fisheries and Aquatic Resources issued FAO 263, dividing Philippine waters into 12 Fisheries Management Areas.

In 2022, there were 2,302,648 fisherfolk registered with BFAR, of which 50.96% were in capture fisheries, 11.27% in aquaculture, 11.18% in gleaning, 6.83% in vending, and 1.96% in processing. Of these registered fisherfolk, 70% were men and 30% were women. Most are older: 9% are 30 or below, with 21.13% aged 31 to 40, 22.97% aged 51 to 60, and 24.42% older than that. Overall production was 4.34 million MT worth PHP 326.57 billion, of which aquaculture produced 2.35 million MT (54.15%), municipal fisheries 1.13 million MT (25.96%), and commercial fisheries 862,686.35 MT (19.89%).

== See also ==
- Fisherfolk Movement of the Philippines
