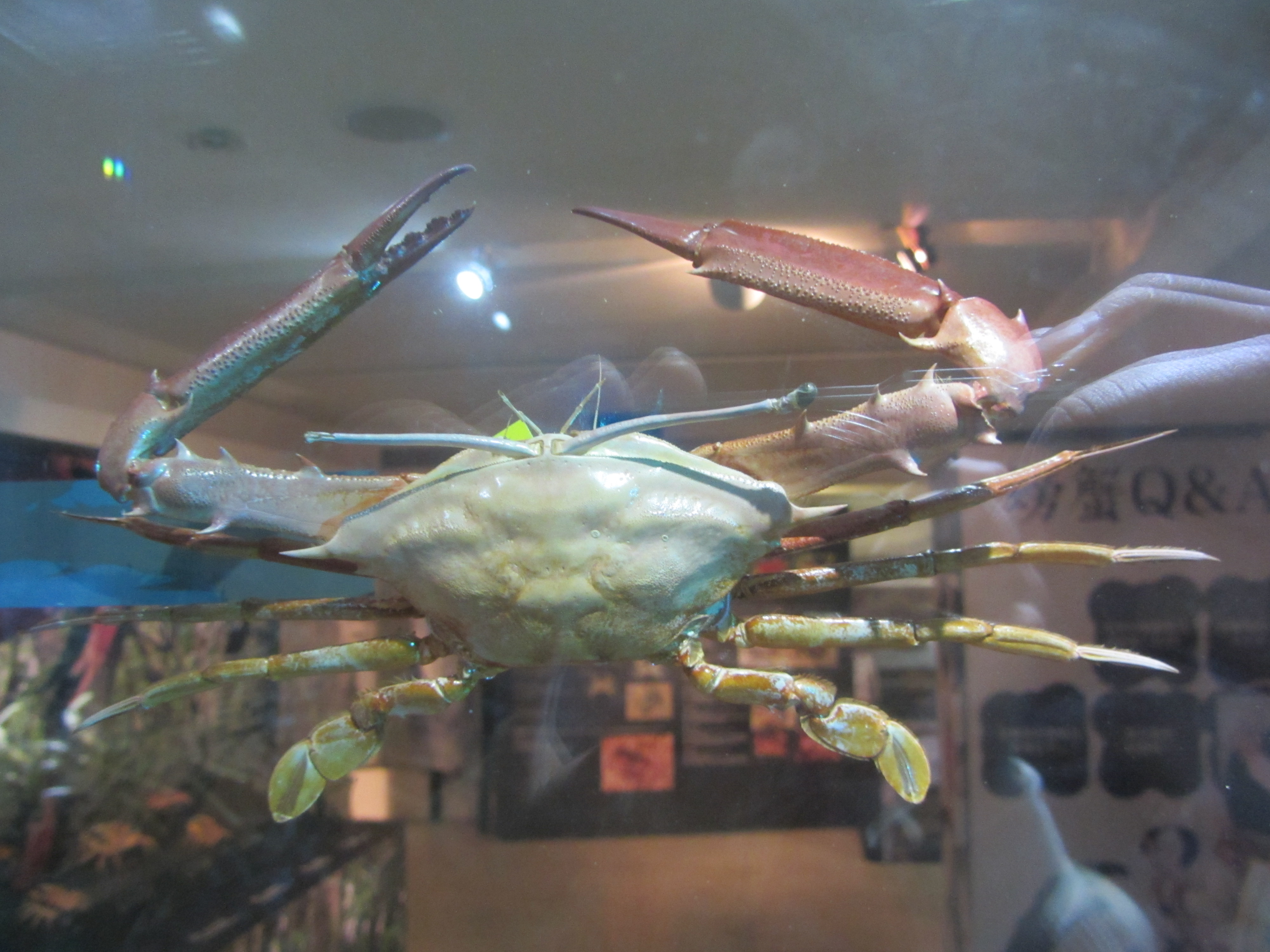

Scientific classification
- Kingdom: Animalia
- Phylum: Arthropoda
- Clade: Pancrustacea
- Class: Malacostraca
- Order: Decapoda
- Suborder: Pleocyemata
- Infraorder: Brachyura
- Family: Portunidae
- Genus: Podophthalmus
- Species: P. vigil

Binomial name
- Podophthalmus vigil (Weber, 1798)

= Podophthalmus vigil =

Species of crab

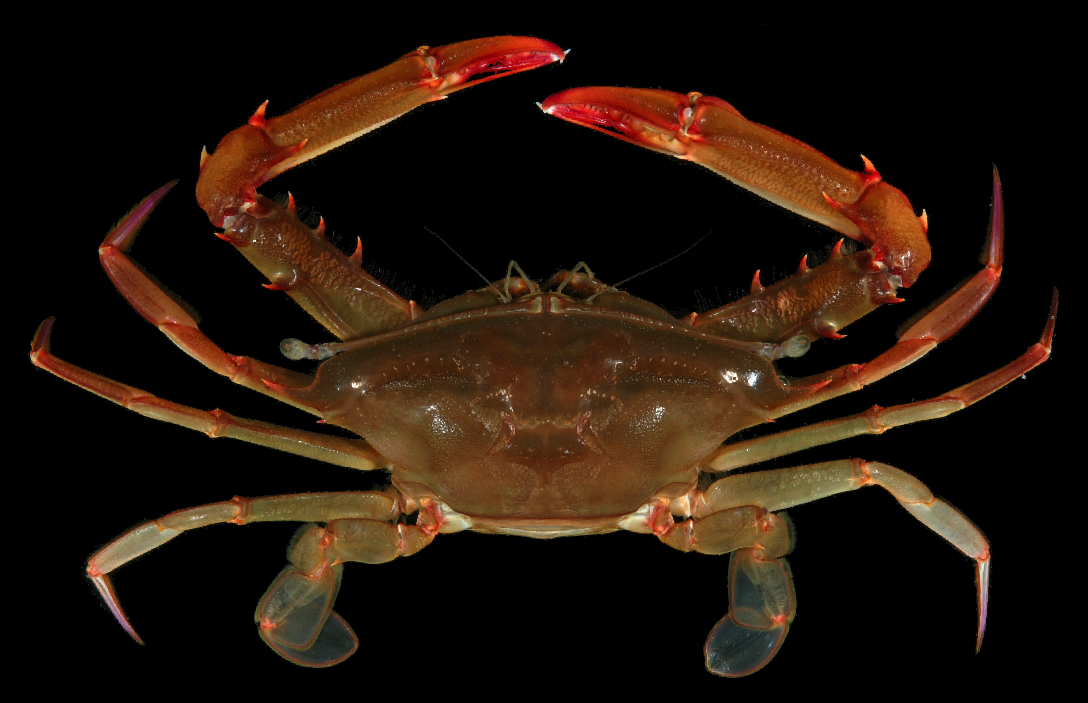
Podophthalmus vigil

Podophthalmus vigil is a species of swimmer crab found in tropical areas of the Indo-Pacific Ocean, including Hawaii, Japan, South Africa, the Red Sea, Australia. In Australia the crab is found across the north from Exmouth to Moreton Bay. It is commonly known as the long-eyed swimmer crab stalk-eyed swimmer crab, red crab, or periscope crab. Like other swimmer crabs the last pair of legs have flattened ends to form paddles. Colors include a greenish brown carapace with possible red spots, claws and legs pale violet, rose red or dark red. The carapace is typically up to 100mm across, very broad at the front, narrow at the back with a spine on each side. There is a single tooth behind the spine. Males are larger than females and have more elongated limbs.

Podophthalmus vigil lives in shallow sandy and muddy areas, especially in bays and river mouths, in depths up to 70m. It is suggested the long eye stalks allow the crab to move the eyes above its body and raise them into clearer water above turbid silt, and to see further. It is consumed by coastal inhabitants in some countries but is only occasionally caught. At night they have been found swimming near the surface and may be attracted by lights
