= Agoo–Damortis Protected Landscape and Seascape =

National park in La Union, Philippines

- IUCN category V (protected landscape/seascape)
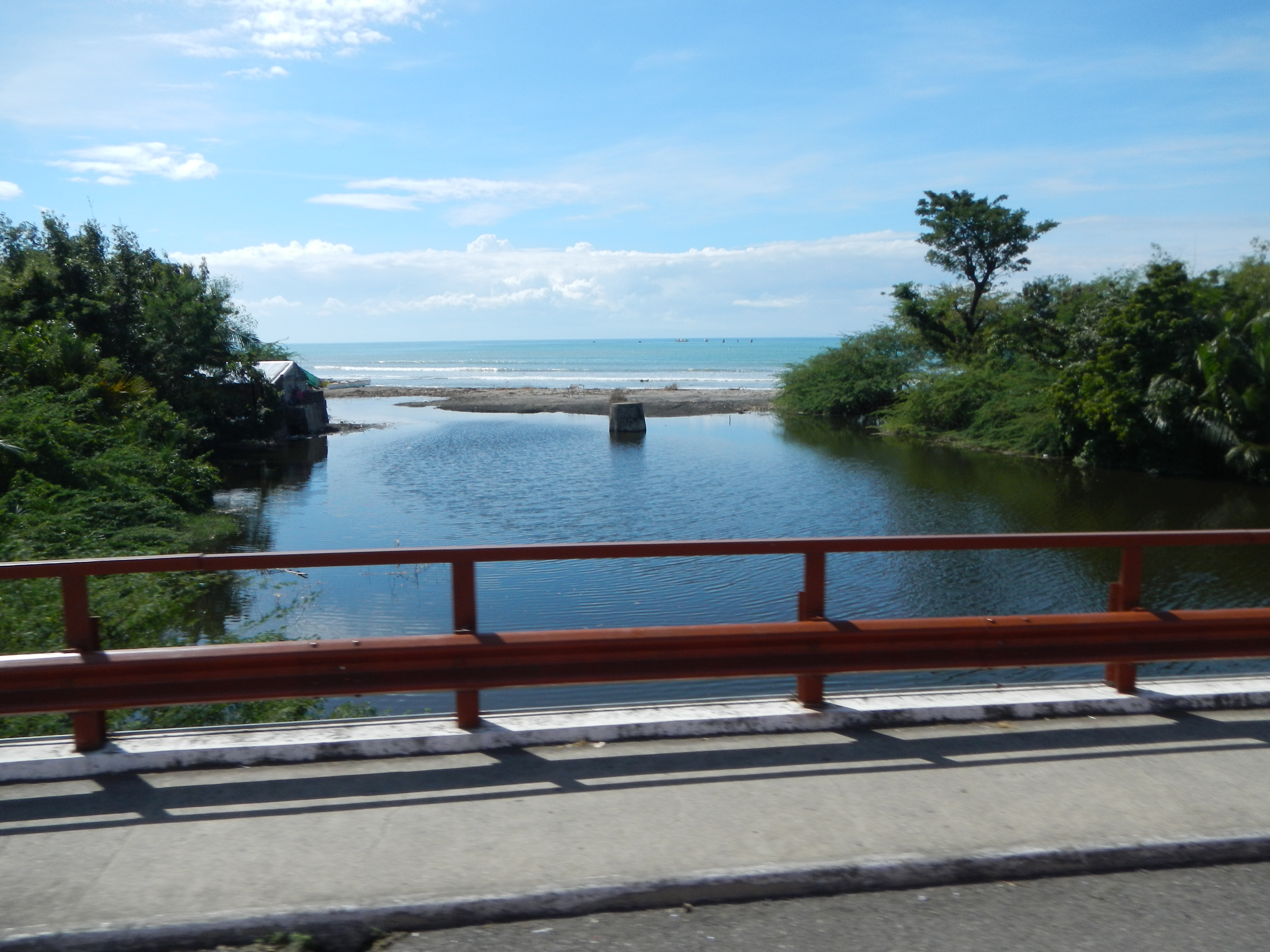
- The coast of Damortis as seen from the Manila North Road

- Location within Luzon Location within Philippines
- Location: La Union, Philippines
- Nearest city: San Fernando, La Union
- Coordinates: 16°21′10″N 120°20′37″E
- Area: 10,648.94 hectares (26,314.1 acres)
- Established: June 19, 1965 (National park); April 23, 2000 (Protected landscape and seascape)
- Governing body: Department of Environment and Natural Resources

The Agoo–Damortis Protected Landscape and Seascape is located on the eastern side of Lingayen Gulf in southern La Union, Philippines. It was established in 2000 to protect 10,648.94 hectares (26,314.1 acres) of coastal area, including mangrove swamps, seagrass beds and stretches of fine black sand beaches. It was first gazetted as a national park in 1965 and was known as the Agoo–Damortis National Seashore Park. It covers approximately 30 kilometres (19 mi) of the coastline of Lingayen Gulf shared between the municipalities of Agoo, Santo Tomas and Rosario.

== Description ==
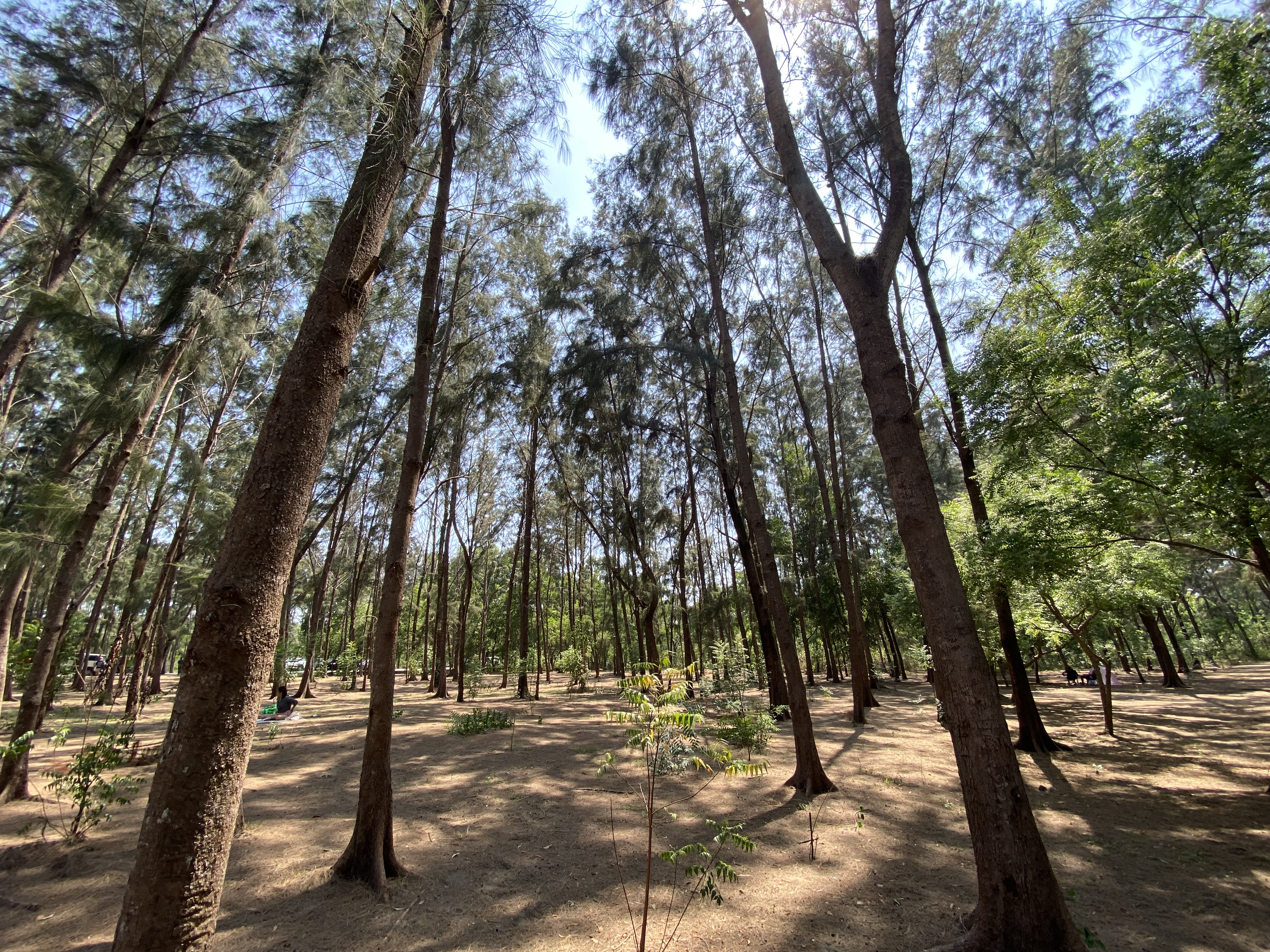
Picnic grounds at the Agoo-Damortis Protected Landscape and Seascape with stands of Casuarina equisetifolia (aroo or agoho) trees that give the town of Agoo its name

The Agoo–Damortis park is located in 25 coastal barangays in southern La Union from Santa Rita in Agoo to the border with the province of Pangasinan. It is fed by three rivers, namely the Agoo, Bani and Cupang Rivers. The park includes the Santo Tomas Cove (also known as Damortis Cove) in Santo Tomas formed by a sand spit and bank on the western side which extends for 4 kilometres (2.5 mi) southwards in the sitio of Sungyot. The 200-hectare (490-acre) cove is the location of large tracts of fishponds, as well as the Santo Tomas Anchorage and Fish Port. On the park's northern portion in Santa Rita is the 75-hectare (190-acre) Agoo Eco-Tourism World of Fun, an eco-tourism park developed by the local government, which contains a lagoon for fishing, kayaking and other water sport activities, and bicycle lanes along the park's seawall.

The park is just 50 kilometres (31 mi) south of the provincial capital of San Fernando and 230 kilometres (140 mi) north of Manila.

== Flora and fauna ==
Mangroves dominate the foreshore area which provide spawning and nursery grounds for fishes and crustaceans, and habitat for both local and migratory birds. Mangrove species in the area include: Avicennia spp.; Nipa fruticans; Pemphis acidula; Rhizophora apiculata; and Rhizophora mucronata.

The slipmouth, goatfish, bream, snapper, grouper, tigerperch and rabbitfish are some species of fish in the area. Vast expanse of seagrass is also found in the area.
