= Paper park =

Area with weakly enforced environmental protections

A paper park is an area with designated environmental or conservation protection status, but with little actual implementation of environmental management or protection measures. This can stem from process or governance issues, or from weak regulations and lack of enforcement.

== Background ==
A 2020 report by NGO Oceana revealed that many European Marine Protected Areas (MPAs) function as "paper parks," offering minimal real protection. Of the 3,449 Natura 2000 MPAs assessed, 70% faced at least one significant threat, with some sites in the Netherlands and the UK experiencing up to 12 threats. Only 0.07% of the total MPA network was free from any assessed threats, while 86% of the network was impacted by damaging fishing gear.

== See also ==
- Protected area
