= Fisherfolk Movement of the Philippines =

Advocacy group & trade association

The Fisherfolk Movement (in Filipino – Kilusang Mangingisda ng Pilipinas or KM) is a coalition of eight federation and alliances of small fisherfolk in the Philippines. It was founded in January 2002 in Cebu City, Philippines.

The coalition's agenda is to:

1. stop Fish Trade Liberalization in the Philippines
2. strengthen policies that support sustainable fishery practices in the country
3. forge the broadest unity among the fisherfolk sector in the Philippines.

From its beginning in Banilad, Cebu City, KM as the coalition is now known, has continuously campaigned for the interest of the small and marginalized fisherfolk of the country.

It has championed the cause of the sector through its high-profile campaigns through mobilization, propaganda and education.

It has actively joined Laban ng Masa/ Fight of the Masses(a coalition of political parties and social movement in the Philippines) in its political struggle against what it considers to be the corrupt and inept Arroyo Regime in the Philippines. It sought the ouster of Mrs. Gloria Macapagal Arroyo from the presidency and the establishment of a Transitional Revolutionary Government.

KM's campaign to stop the liberalization of the fishing industry of the Philippines has culminated in the founding of the South East Asia Fisherfolk Movement or SEA-FM. The Asian small fisherfolk was formed in recognition of the need to consolidate its ranks in the region in order for them to protect their livelihood and fishing grounds from the onslaught made by trade liberalization.

== Protests ==
KM and its South East Asian counterparts in December 2005 rallied in Hong Kong at the 6th Ministerial Meeting of the World Trade Organization (WTO). It utilized a "fluvial parade" or the parade of boats and ships in the harbour fronting the convention center where the WTO meeting was being held as the means to protest the ongoing talks that would further enhance international policies on fisheries trade.

In the culmination of its campaign on the so-called Doha development round in 2006, KM again with its allies in the South East Asian region went to Geneva, Switzerland. For the 1st time in Geneva, a water based campaign, using Asian boats (which were crafted in advance by Asian fisherfolk that went to Geneva) was successfully made. The Asian boats were joined by local yachts and campaigners in its campaign in Lake Geneva.
