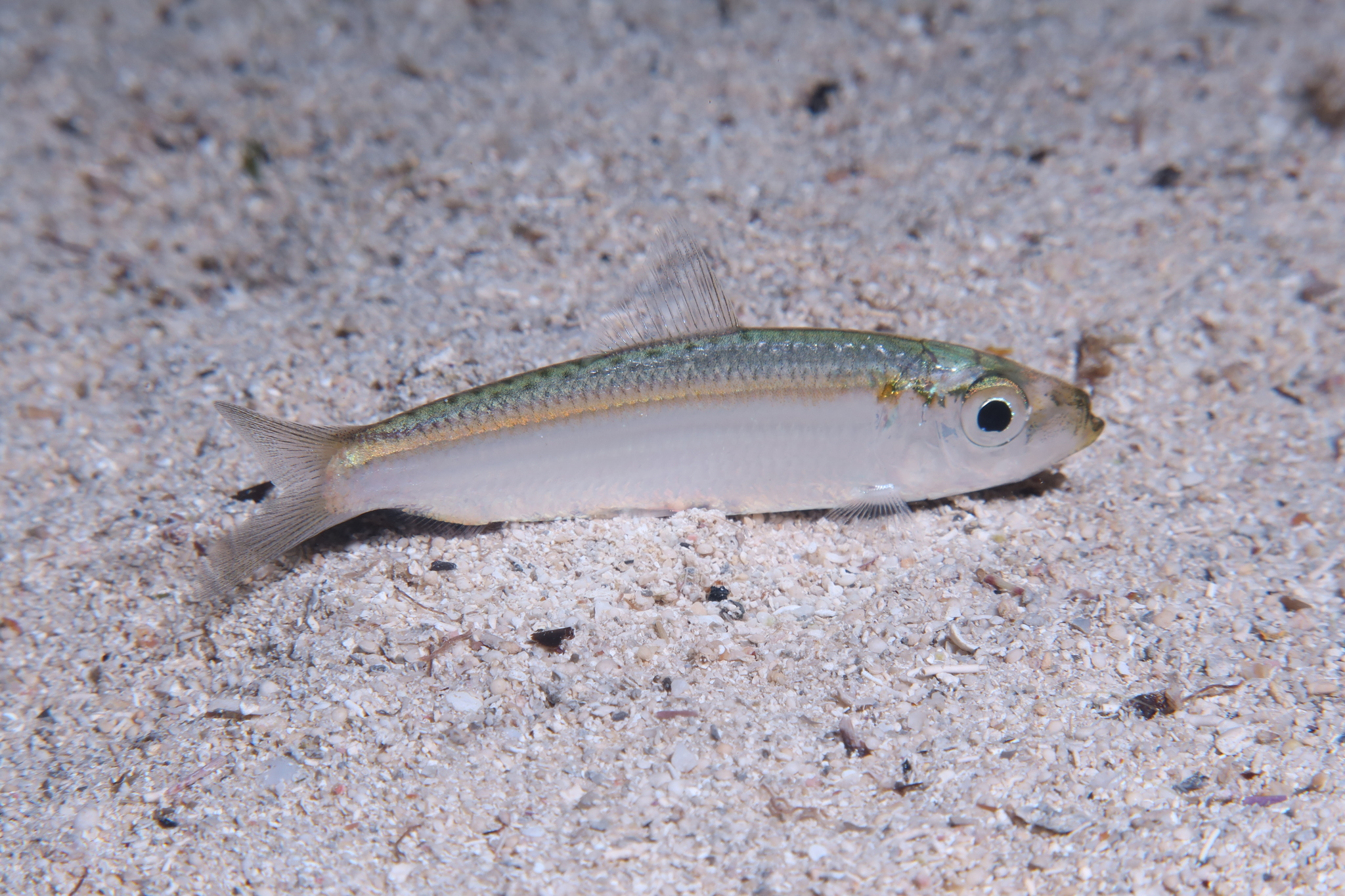

Conservation status
- Least Concern (IUCN 3.1)

Scientific classification
- Kingdom: Animalia
- Phylum: Chordata
- Class: Actinopterygii
- Division: Teleostei
- Order: Clupeiformes
- Family: Dorosomatidae
- Genus: Herklotsichthys
- Species: H. punctatus

Binomial name
- Herklotsichthys punctatus (Rüppell, 1837)

Synonyms
- Clupea punctata Rüppell, 1837; Harengula arabica Valenciennes, 1847; Spratella erythraea , Rüppell, 1852

= Herklotsichthys punctatus =

Species of fish

Herklotsichthys punctatus, the spotback herring or spotted herring, is a species of herring from the family Dorosomatidae. It is endemic to the Red Sea and likely entered the Mediterranean Sea via the Suez Canal and is now common on the Levantine Basin.

== Description ==
Herklotsichthys punctatus is a small silvery fish which shows a moderate degree of compression on the body which is said to resemble juveniles of Sardinella spp. The belly has a sharp keel of scutes. The posterior margin of the gill slit has two distinct fleshy outgrowths; there are few gill raker with 29–39 on the lower part of the first arch. There are 3–6 streaks on the top of the head and prominent rows of teeth on the roof of the mouth. There are 8 rays on the pelvic fin, while the dorsal fin has 13–21 soft rays and the anal fin has 12–23 soft rays. The back is blueish-green with numerous small black spots, the flanks have a golden or orange mid=lateral line, the underside is silvery. It grows to 8.5 cm, but is more usually 5–7 cm in length.

== Distribution ==
Herklotsichthys punctatus is distributed in the western Indian Ocean: Red Sea and possibly the Gulf of Aden but this species and other species of Herklotsichthys have been confused, especially Herklotsichthys quadrimaculatus. It was first recorded in the Mediterranean in 1943 off the coast of Palestine and is now common in the southeastern basin of the Mediterranean Sea all the way to the Gulf of Sirte.

== Biology ==
Herklotsichthys punctatus is a pelagic and neritic species which van be found from the surface to 20m in depth. It is a sociable species which forms schools in coastal waters H. punctatus feeds almost entirely on zooplankton which it forages for in the upper layers of the water column. Copepods are the main prey followed by euphausiid and megalopa with the remainder of the diet being made up of the larvae of Penaeus prawns, mysids, Lucifer prawns, pelagic gastropods and fish. Feeding was most intense during the south-west monsoon from June to September and during the early hours of the day rather than during the afternoon hours. Smaller fish to 90 mm feed mainly on smaller organisms such as copepods. Larger fish prey on larger organisms such as fish and pelagic gastropods. Mature fish show an intense feeding activity in the months of April and August–September which immediately precede the spawning seasons of this fish.

== Human use ==
Herklotsichthys punctatus is of minor commercial importance fisheries, fished for using trawls and seines in the Mediterranean but with low price reliability the marketing opportunities are limited. It may be marketed as fresh fish, or it is preserved by drying and dry salting or it is made into fish balls.

== Naming ==
Herklotsichthys punctatus was described by the German zoologist Eduard Rüppell in 1837. The generic name Herklotsichthys was coined by the Australian ichthyologist Gilbert Percy Whitley in 1951 and honours the Dutch zoologist Jan Adrianus Herklots, while the specific name punctata refers to the spots.
