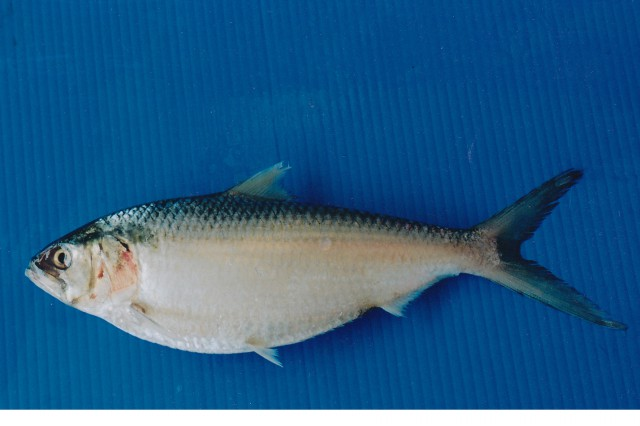

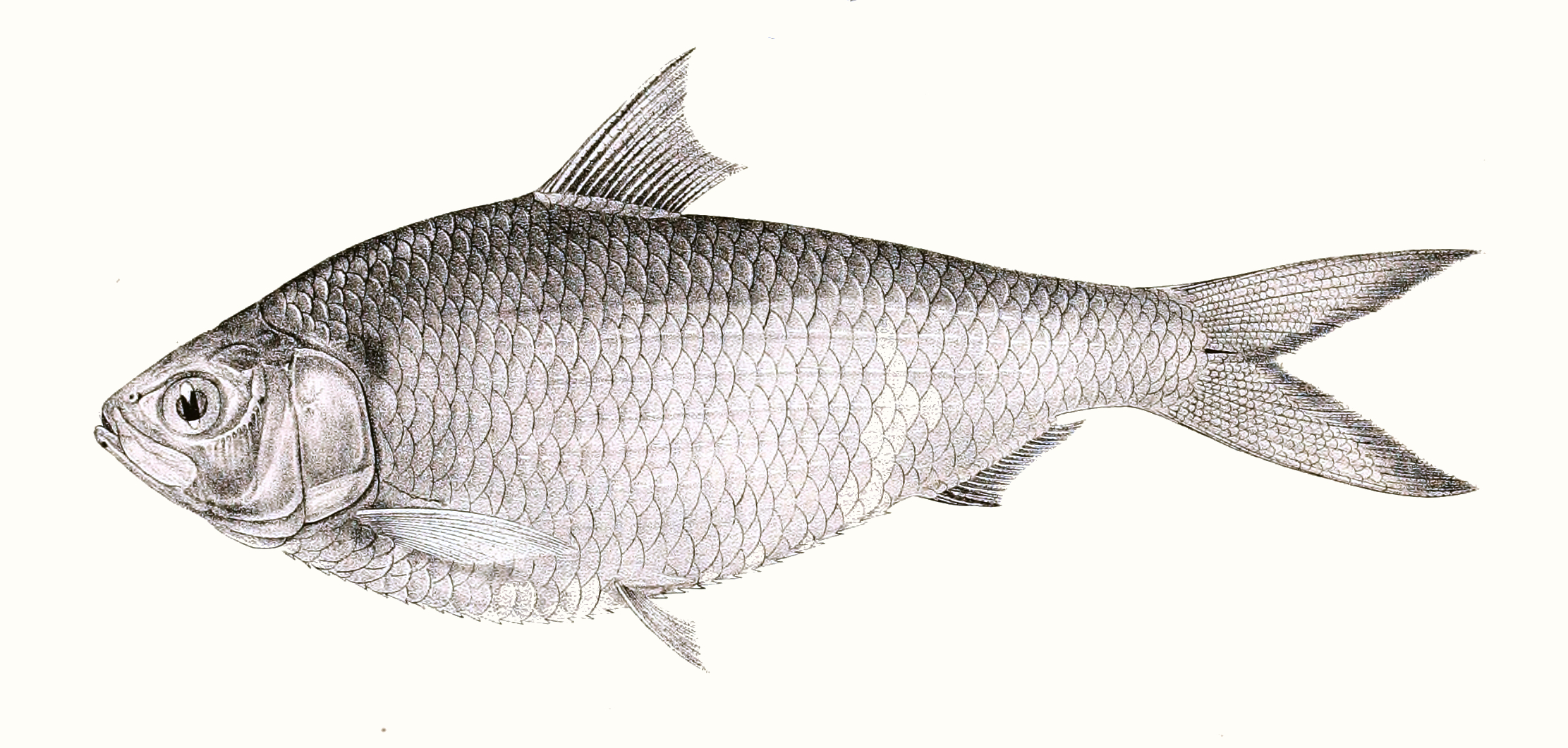

Conservation status
- Vulnerable (IUCN 3.1)

Scientific classification
- Kingdom: Animalia
- Phylum: Chordata
- Class: Actinopterygii
- Division: Teleostei
- Order: Clupeiformes
- Family: Dorosomatidae
- Genus: Tenualosa
- Species: T. toli

Binomial name
- Tenualosa toli (Valenciennes, 1847)

= Toli shad =

Species of fish

The toli shad or Chinese herring (Tenualosa toli) is a fish of the family Clupeidae, a species of shad distributed in the western Indian Ocean and the Bay of Bengal to the Java Sea and the South China Sea. It may be found in Mauritius and the Cambodian Mekong near the Vietnam border. It inhabits fast-flowing, turbid estuaries and adjacent coastal waters.

Known as ikan terubok in Malaysia, T. toli is highly prized among Malaysians for its meat and eggs. Overfishing has depleted the population alarmingly in Southeast Asia. Research center and fish farming are carried out by local farmers in many parts of Malaysia for conservation and commercial purposes.

In Bangladesh, where it is known as Ilisha Chandana (চন্দনা ইলিশ), it is commercially less important than T. ilisha. It is known as ငါးသလောက် • (nga:sa.lauk) /ŋəθəlaʊʔ/ in Myanmar, Trey Palung in Cambodia, Bhing in Maharashtra, Palwa in Gujarat, and Ullam / Seriya in Sri Lanka.

In Thailand, T. toli is called pla talumpuk (ปลาตะลุมพุก) or pla lumpuk (ปลาหลุมพุก). Its name is the origin of Laem Talumphuk (Talumphuk Cape) in Pak Phanang District, Nakhon Si Thammarat Province, where the fish used to be found in abundance.

There are also records indicating that in the past, when the Bang Yi Khan Distillery in Bangkok was still producing Mekhong liquor, large amounts of yeast were discharged into the Chao Phraya River. This attracted T. toli to swim from the Gulf of Thailand into the freshwater stretches of the river to feed on the yeast. The fish were commonly found from the area beneath what is now the Rama VIII Bridge, upstream as far as Pak Kret District in Nonthaburi Province. This abundance also made the fish a valuable commodity. In 1935, Hugh McCormick Smith, the first Thailand's director-general of the Department of Fisheries, observed that T. toli was highly sought after, particularly by the Chinese community. Fishermen using drift gillnets could sell each specimen for 1–3 baht, a price then equivalent to 3–4 sacks of rice. According to Kittipong Jaruthanin, a Thai field ichthyologist specializing in freshwater species, the fish were not drawn to the river solely to feed, but also to spawn.

Ascending rivers to breed, T. toli is distinguished from similar clupeids, except Hilsa kelee (kelee shad or five spot herring), by a distinct median notch in upper jaw. Biology of this protandrous hermaphrodite is presumed to be similar to that of Tenualosa ilisha, but the fewer gill rakers suggest an intake of larger species of zooplankton as food.
