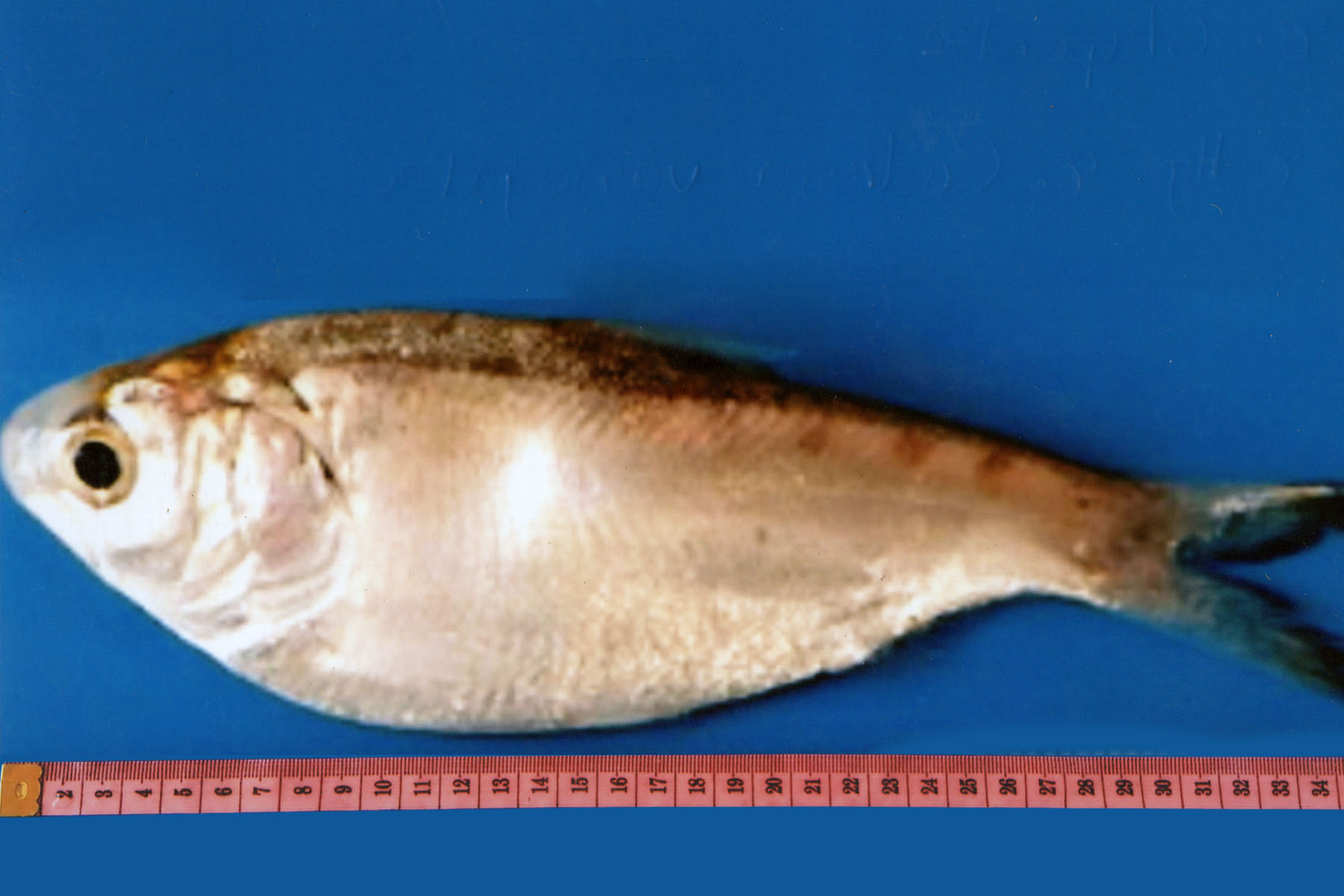

Conservation status
- Least Concern (IUCN 3.1)

Scientific classification
- Kingdom: Animalia
- Phylum: Chordata
- Class: Actinopterygii
- Order: Clupeiformes
- Family: Dorosomatidae
- Genus: Gudusia
- Species: G. variegata

Binomial name
- Gudusia variegata (Day, 1870)

Synonyms
- Clupea variegata Day, 1870

= Gudusia variegata =

Species of fish

Gudusa variegata, the Burmes river shad or variegated herring, is a species of freshwater ray-finned fish belonging to the family Dorosomatidae, the gizzard shads and sardinellas. This species has been only been confirmed to occur in Myanmar in the Irrawaddy River, the Chindwin River and Lake Indawgyi.
