= Tenualosa macrura =

Conservation status
- Near Threatened (IUCN 3.1)

Scientific classification
- Kingdom: Animalia
- Phylum: Chordata
- Class: Actinopterygii
- Order: Clupeiformes
- Family: Dorosomatidae
- Genus: Tenualosa
- Species: T. macrura

Binomial name
- Tenualosa macrura Pieter Bleeker, 1852

Synonyms
- Alausa macrurus Bleeker, 1852; Clupea macrura (Bleeker, 1852); Hilsa macrura (Bleeker, 1852); Macrura macrura (Bleeker, 1852)

Species of fish

Tenualosa macrura, also known as the longtail shad, is a species of fish in the family Dorosomatidae.

== Description ==
Tenualosa macrura was first described by Pieter Bleeker in 1852, is a species of shad in the order Clupeiformes. Found in tropical and subtropical waters of Southeast Asia, it inhabits coastal areas, estuaries, and river mouths, displaying an anadromous life cycle where it migrates upriver to spawn in freshwater. The fish is characterized by its streamlined, silvery body and an elongated tail, and can reach a maximum length of 52 centimetres. Feeding primarily on plankton, it plays an essential role in the aquatic food web.

== Biology ==
It is an euryhaline fish, which means it can survive in freshwater, brackish, and marine conditions.It is also a schooling fish and lives in the pelagic-neritic zone; anadromous and tropical climate.

== Fisheries ==
Tenualosa macrura is economically significant and is widely harvested for human consumption. However, overfishing, habitat loss, and pollution threaten its populations, highlighting the need for sustainable management and conservation efforts.

== Habitat and distribution ==
Tenualosa macrura is found in tropical and subtropical waters of Southeast Asia in the eastern Indian Ocean between 7° N and 9° S and between 101° E and 119° E. It is found at depths of up to 50 metres in the waters off Malaysia, Indonesia and the southern tip of Thailand.
