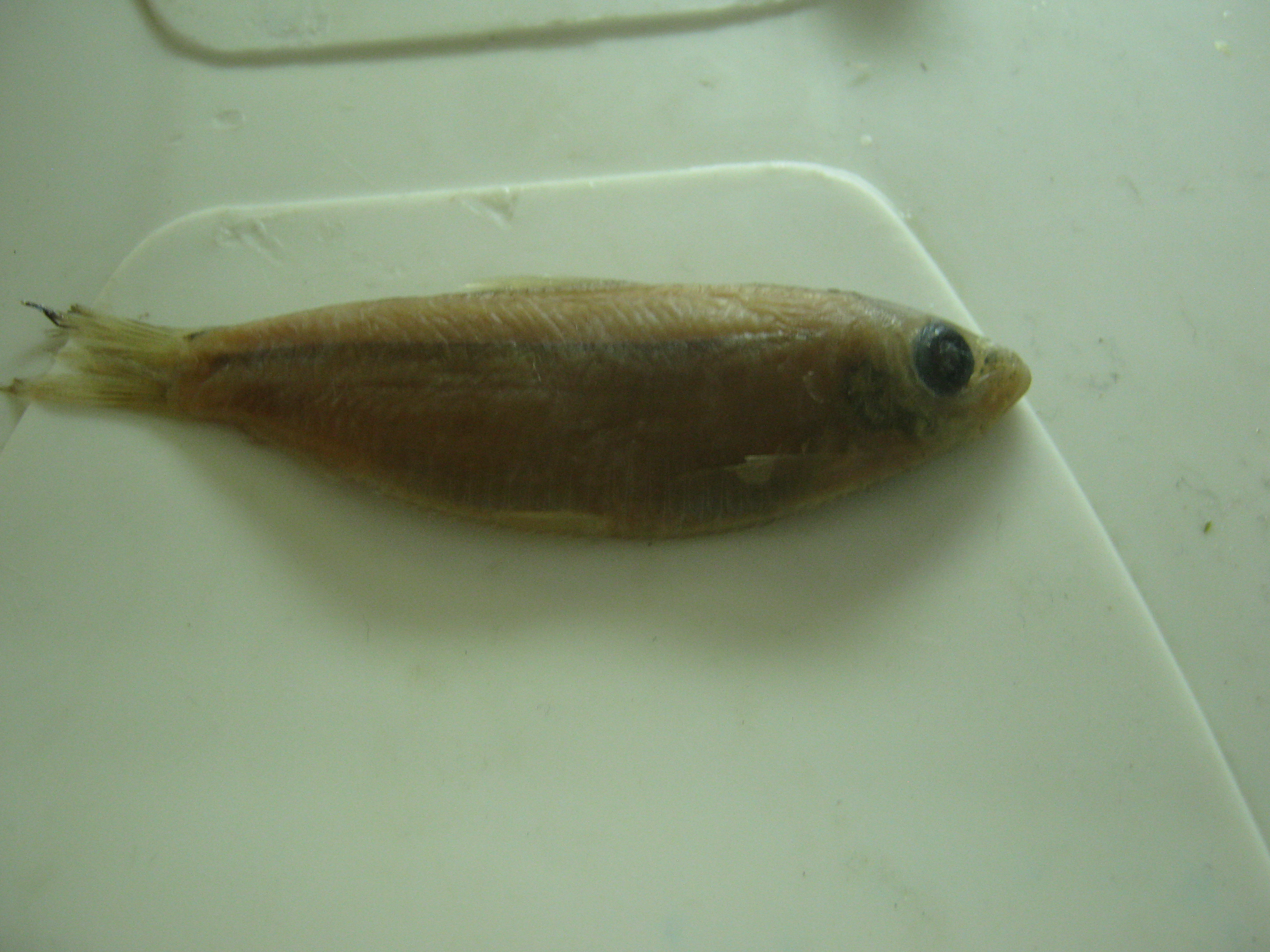

Conservation status
- Least Concern (IUCN 3.1)

Scientific classification
- Kingdom: Animalia
- Phylum: Chordata
- Class: Actinopterygii
- Order: Clupeiformes
- Family: Dorosomatidae
- Genus: Lile
- Species: L. stolifera

Binomial name
- Lile stolifera (Jordan & Gilbert, 1882)

Synonyms
- Clupea stolifera; Harengula stolifera; Sardinella stolifera

= Lile stolifera =

Species of ray-finned fish

Lile stolifera is a species of ray-finned fish, belonging to the Dorosomatidae family. It is mainly found in the Eastern Pacific, from the Gulf of California to the Gulf of Guayaquil.
