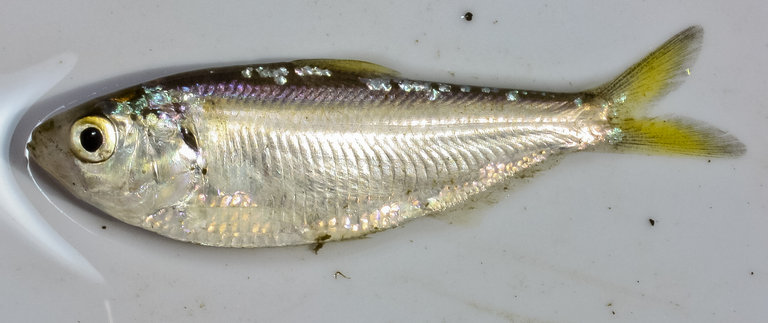

Conservation status
- Least Concern (IUCN 3.1)

Scientific classification
- Kingdom: Animalia
- Phylum: Chordata
- Class: Actinopterygii
- Order: Clupeiformes
- Family: Dorosomatidae
- Genus: Dorosoma
- Species: D. petenense

Binomial name
- Dorosoma petenense (Günther, 1867)

Synonyms
- Chatoessus mexicanus Günther, 1868; Dorosoma petenense subsp. vanhyningi (Weed, 1925); Meletta petenensis Günther, 1867; Signalosa atchafalayae Evermann & Kendall, 1898; Signalosa atchafalayae subsp. vanhyningi Weed, 1925; Signalosa mexicana Günther, 1868; Signalosa mexicana subsp. campi Weed, 1925

= Threadfin shad =

Species of fish

The threadfin shad (Dorosoma petenense) is a small pelagic freshwater forage fish common in lakes, large streams and reservoirs of the Southeastern United States. Like the American gizzard shad, the threadfin shad has an elongated dorsal fin, but unlike the gizzard shad, its mouth is more terminal without a projecting upper jaw. The fins of threadfin shad often have a yellowish color, especially the caudal fin. The back is grey to blue with a dark spot on the shoulder. D. petenense is more often found in moving water, and is rarely found deep in the water column. It occurs in large schools, sometimes with gizzard shad, and can be seen on the surface at dawn and dusk. The threadfin shad may reach lengths of 8 in (200 mm), but only rarely. This fish is very sensitive to changes in temperature and dissolved oxygen, and die-offs are frequent in late summer and fall, especially when water temperature drops to 42 °F. The threadfin shad is a favorite food for many game fishes, including striped bass, largemouth bass, smallmouth bass, and catfish. This fish is widely introduced throughout the United States as a forage for game fish.

== Description ==
Adult shad grow to a maximum size of 7–8 inches (18–20 cm), but most specimens are about 1 inch (2.5 cm) long. They have yellowish fins.

== Geographic distribution ==
The threadfin shad is native to the U.S., west of the eastern Appalachian Mountains, through the Mississippi basin all along the Gulf of Mexico down to Belize. This species tends to do best in large lakes and rivers. The construction of dams has created more reservoirs, providing more water bodies for the shad to inhabit. This has expanded the home range of the fish, as has the rise in temperatures in northern lakes.

Threadfin shad have been introduced outside of their original as a supplemental forage. Populations have become established on the American West Coast from Oregon south to San Diego Bay and the Gulf of California.

== Ecology ==
The threadfin lives a pelagic life in natural lakes, reservoirs, and large streams. In addition to freshwater habitats, it also inhabits brackish waters such as estuaries and lagoons. It prefers areas with limited vegetation. It is found to a depth of 50 metres (160 ft), and moves between deep water during the day and shallow areas at night.

The young and adults feed on a variety of planktonic organisms and organic debris. Many researchers believe that threadfin shad often compete for plankton with young-of-the-year predator species, especially largemouth bass. Threadfin shad is a very important food source for many game fish such as the largemouth bass. It has little known competition, but one species known to have a similar lifestyle is the gizzard shad (Dorosoma cepedianum).

== Life history ==
The shad spawns in the spring when the water temperature is in the upper 60s (°F). Threadfin shad are a pelagic (open water) schooling species that is typically found in large numbers. The shad spawn occurs in the spring and early summer with a secondary spawn often occurring in the early fall. Spawning usually occurs early in the morning on available vegetation. The eggs adhere to submerged and floating objects. Females lay from 2,000 to 24,000 eggs. The young reach reproductive adulthood at one year of age. Life expectancy seldom exceeds 2 to 3 years.

== Current management ==
Many populations of threadfin shad have been introduced by humans to the far north, resulting in large die-offs in the winter when water temperatures fall below 42 °F. This die-off affects both humans and wildlife. A tide of dead fish floats ashore, creating a strong odor unpleasant to humans. The die-off also gives some bird species an unnatural feeding habit, as well. The species should not be transplanted into water bodies that drop below 42 °F. This species is not endangered and has relatively healthy populations.
