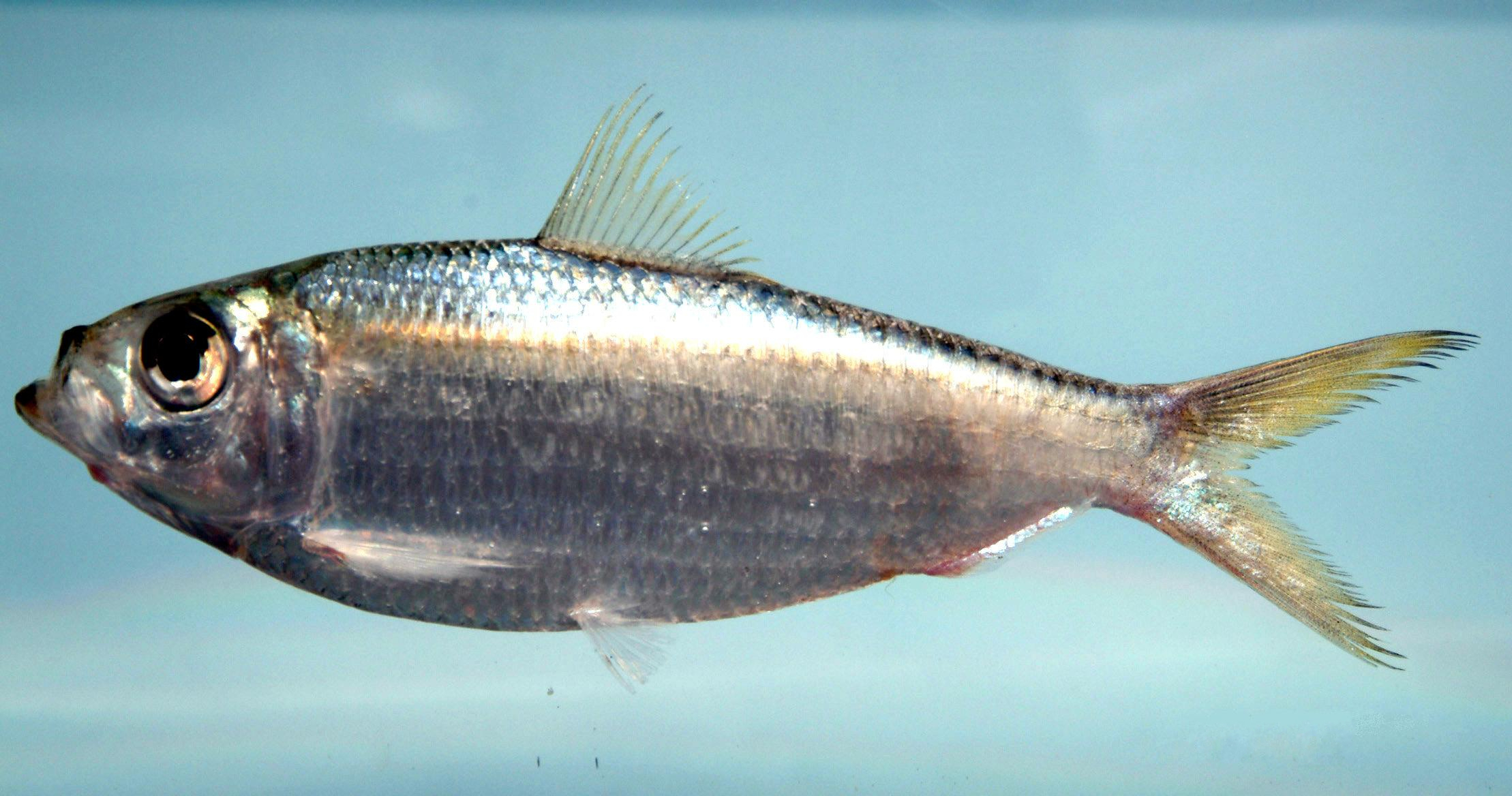

Conservation status
- Least Concern (IUCN 3.1)

Scientific classification
- Kingdom: Animalia
- Phylum: Chordata
- Class: Actinopterygii
- Order: Clupeiformes
- Family: Dorosomatidae
- Genus: Harengula
- Species: H. jaguana

Binomial name
- Harengula jaguana Poey, 1865

Synonyms
- Harengula majorina Storey, 1938

= Scaled sardine =

Species of fish

The scaled sardine, Harengula jaguana, is a herring-like fish in the family Clupeidae. It is native to coastal waters of the western Atlantic Ocean, from the Gulf of Mexico (where it is known as the pilchard or whitebait) down to Brazil where it is called mata.

It has a solid back with dark streaks and usually a small dark spot at the upper edge of the operculum and sometimes one located at the shoulder. It grows up to 9 inches (23 cm) in length but typically is little more than half that size.

It is a fast-growing species, living only 12 to 18 months.

Scaled sardines are often referred to by anglers as greenbacks, though that common name can also refer to the Atlantic threadfin herring (or Atlantic thread herring). They can usually be caught with strings of wire loops known as minnow rings, sabiki rigs or by cast netting.

They are taken by anglers for use as bait or for personal consumption.

== Appearance ==
Also known as pilchard and greenback.

- Solid-color on back with dark streaks
- Usually has a single small, dark spot at upper edge of gill cover
- Sometimes one spot present on shoulder
