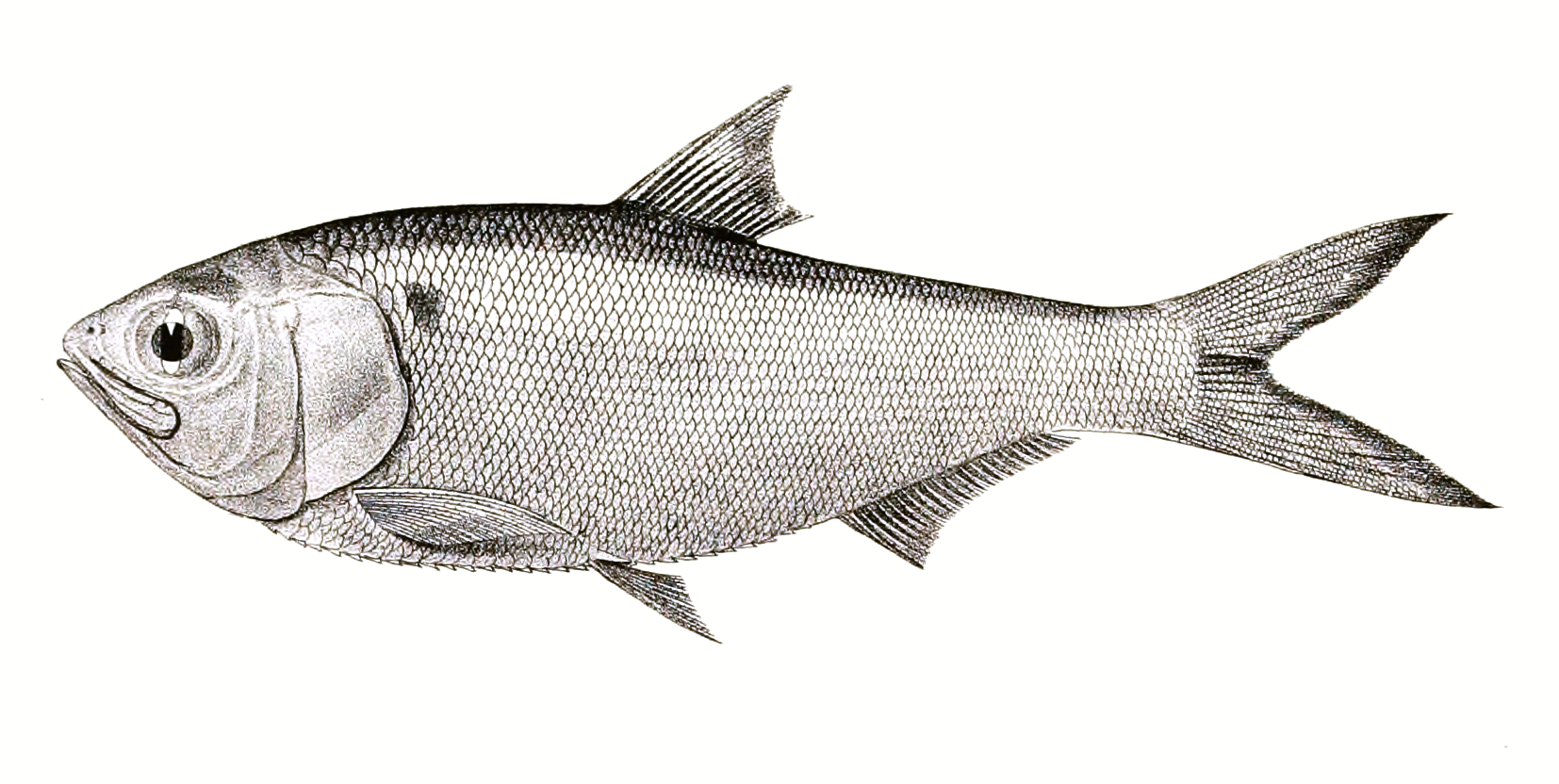

Conservation status
- Least Concern (IUCN 3.1)

Scientific classification
- Domain: Eukaryota
- Kingdom: Animalia
- Phylum: Chordata
- Class: Actinopterygii
- Order: Clupeiformes
- Family: Dorosomatidae
- Genus: Gudusia
- Species: G. chapra

Binomial name
- Gudusia chapra (Hamilton, 1822)

Synonyms
- Clupanodon chapra Hamilton, 1822; Clupea chapra (Hamilton, 1822); Clupanodon cagius Hamilton, 1822; Clupea indica Gray, 1834; Clupea champil Gray, 1834; Alausa microlepis Valenciennes, 1847; Clupea suhia Chaudhuri, 1912; Gudusia godanahiai Srivastava, 1968

= Gudusia chapra =

Species of fish

Gudusia chapra, or the Indian river shad, is a species of fish in the family Clupeidae, occurring in rivers of India and Bangladesh draining to the Bay of Bengal (e.g. the Ganges, Brahmaputra, Mahanadi River), and also reported from Pakistan and Nepal. Outside the rivers it also occurs in ponds, beels, ditches and inundated fields.
