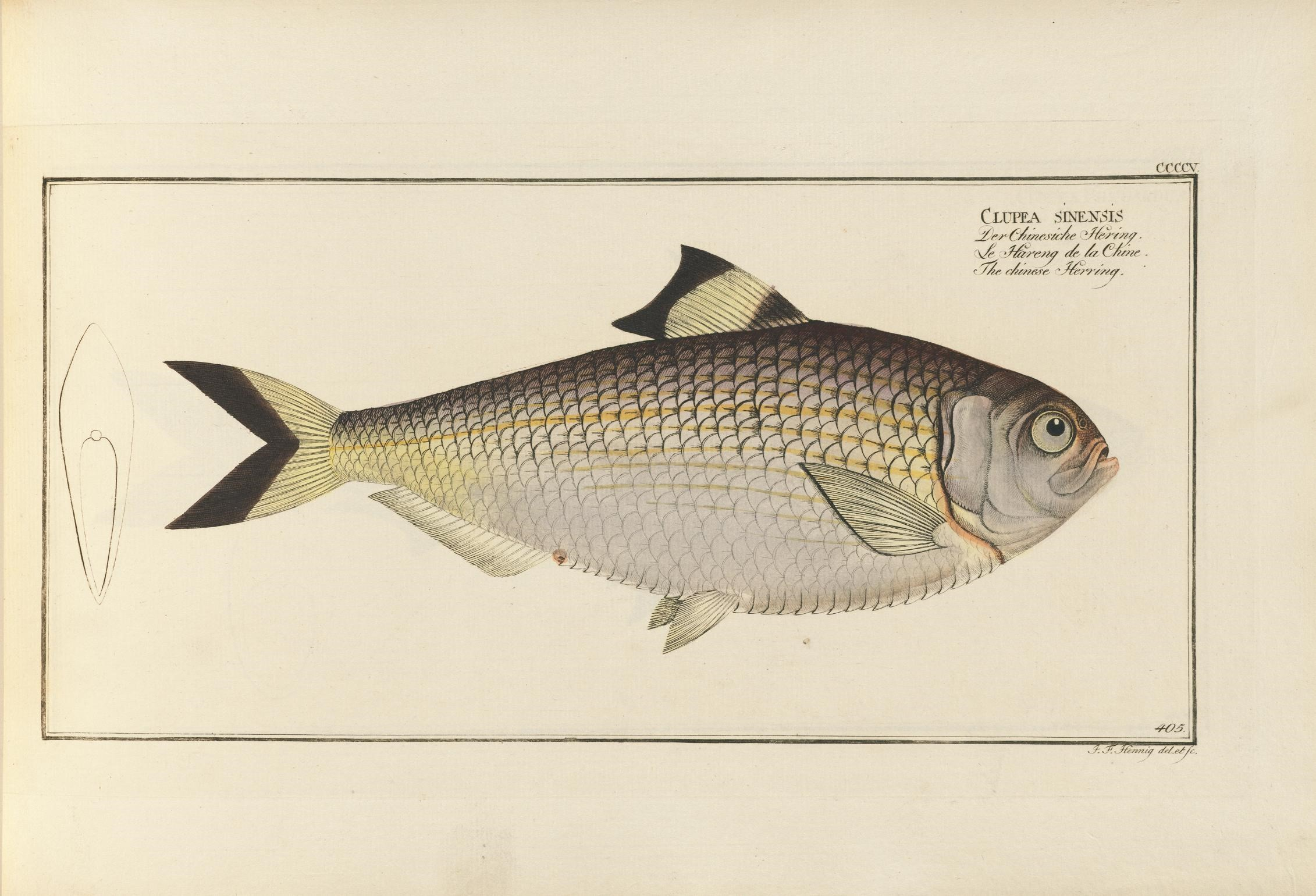

Scientific classification
- Kingdom: Animalia
- Phylum: Chordata
- Class: Actinopterygii
- Division: Teleostei
- Order: Clupeiformes
- Family: Dorosomatidae
- Genus: Tenualosa
- Species: T. reevesii

Binomial name
- Tenualosa reevesii John Richardson, 1846

Synonyms
- Alosa reevesii _{Richardson, 1846}; Hilsa reevesii _{(Richardson, 1846)}; Macrura reevesii _{(Richardson, 1846)}; Macrura reevesi _{(Richardson, 1846)}; Tenualosa reevesi _{(Richardson, 1846)}

= Tenualosa reevesii =

Species of fish

Tenualosa reevesii, also known as Reeves shad, is a species of fish belonging to the family Dorosomatidae.

== Description ==
Tenualosa reevesii was first described by John Richardson in 1846. Tenualosa reevesii belongs to the genus Tenualosa. It can attain a maximum length of 61.6 cm (24.3 in) and a maximum weight of 5 kg (11 lb) and lives up to 8 years.

== Distribution and biology ==
It is an euryhaline schooling fish, meaning it can survive freshwater, brackish and marine conditions and is pelagic-neritic, also is migratory and is anadromous and lives in tropical climate (31°N-5°N, 95°E-123°E) being found in waters off the coast of china up to the island of Phuket in the Andaman sea that lives between 0–50 m depth.

== Reproduction ==
Mature adult Tenualosa reevesii ascend back to rivers to breed.
