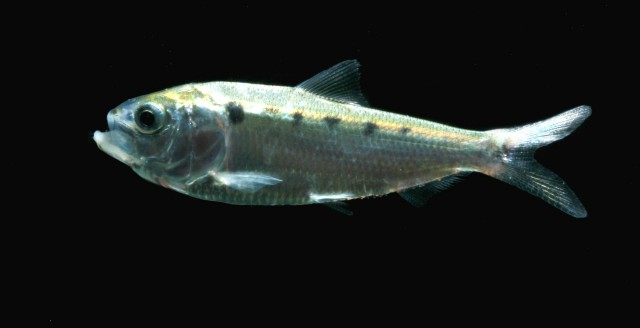

Conservation status
- Vulnerable (IUCN 3.1)

Scientific classification
- Kingdom: Animalia
- Phylum: Chordata
- Class: Actinopterygii
- Order: Clupeiformes
- Family: Dorosomatidae
- Genus: Tenualosa
- Species: T. thibaudeaui

Binomial name
- Tenualosa thibaudeaui (J. Durand, 1940)

= Laotian shad =

Tenualosa thibaudeaui

Species of fish

The Laotian shad (Tenualosa thibaudeaui) is a species of fish in the family Clupeidae. It is endemic to the Mekong River drainage in Cambodia, Laos, Thailand, and Vietnam.

The species has a short, stout body with a broad, highly compressed profile. The mouth is wide, with the lower jaw protruding beyond the upper jaw. The eyes are covered by a thin membrane. The scales are large but easily shed. The body is silver, with vivid bluish-purple spots along the sides. Fully grown individuals reach a body length of approximately 30 cm (1.0 ft).

This species of shad exhibits migratory behavior, moving up and down rivers to spawn and feed. It is a filter feeder, consuming only plankton and detritus. Locally, it is used as a food fish, and wild-caught specimens are occasionally collected for the aquarium trade. However, it is difficult to keep in captivity, as individuals are easily startled and their large scales shed readily.
