= Rhinosardinia bahiensis =

Scientific classification
- Domain: Eukaryota
- Kingdom: Animalia
- Phylum: Chordata
- Class: Actinopterygii
- Order: Clupeiformes
- Family: Dorosomatidae
- Genus: Rhinosardinia
- Species: R. bahiensis

Binomial name
- Rhinosardinia bahiensis (Steindachner, 1879)

Species of fish

Rhinosardinia bahiensis, commonly known as the Bahia spat, is a ray-finned fish in the family Clupeidae. It is found in South America, residing in freshwater, brackish, and pelagic environments in a tropical climate. It has 13 to 21 dorsal soft rays, 15 to 18 anal soft rays, and 43 vertebrae.
