= Hilsa (disambiguation) =

Hilsa is a common name for Tenualosa ilisha a fish found in Bangladesh and India.

Hilsa may also refer to:

- Hilsa (genus), a genus of fishes containing a single species, Hilsa kelee, found in the Indian and Pacific Oceans
- Hilsa, Bihar, a city and a notified area in the Indian state of Bihar
- Hilsa, Nepal, a town in Nepal
