= Blackstripe herring =

Conservation status
- Least Concern (IUCN 3.1)

Scientific classification
- Kingdom: Animalia
- Phylum: Chordata
- Class: Actinopterygii
- Order: Clupeiformes
- Family: Dorosomatidae
- Genus: Lile
- Species: L. nigrofasciata

Binomial name
- Lile nigrofasciata Castro-Aguirre, Ruiz-Campos & Balart, 2002

Species of fish

The blackstripe herring (Lile nigrofasciata) is a species of tropical sardine found in the Tropical Eastern Pacific, first documented in a coastal lagoon near Sonora, Mexico. Its diet consists of pelagic crustaceans, zooplankton, fish larvae, and fish eggs. It is typically found in muddy or sandy shores and high-salinity estuaries at depths of 0–10 meters.
