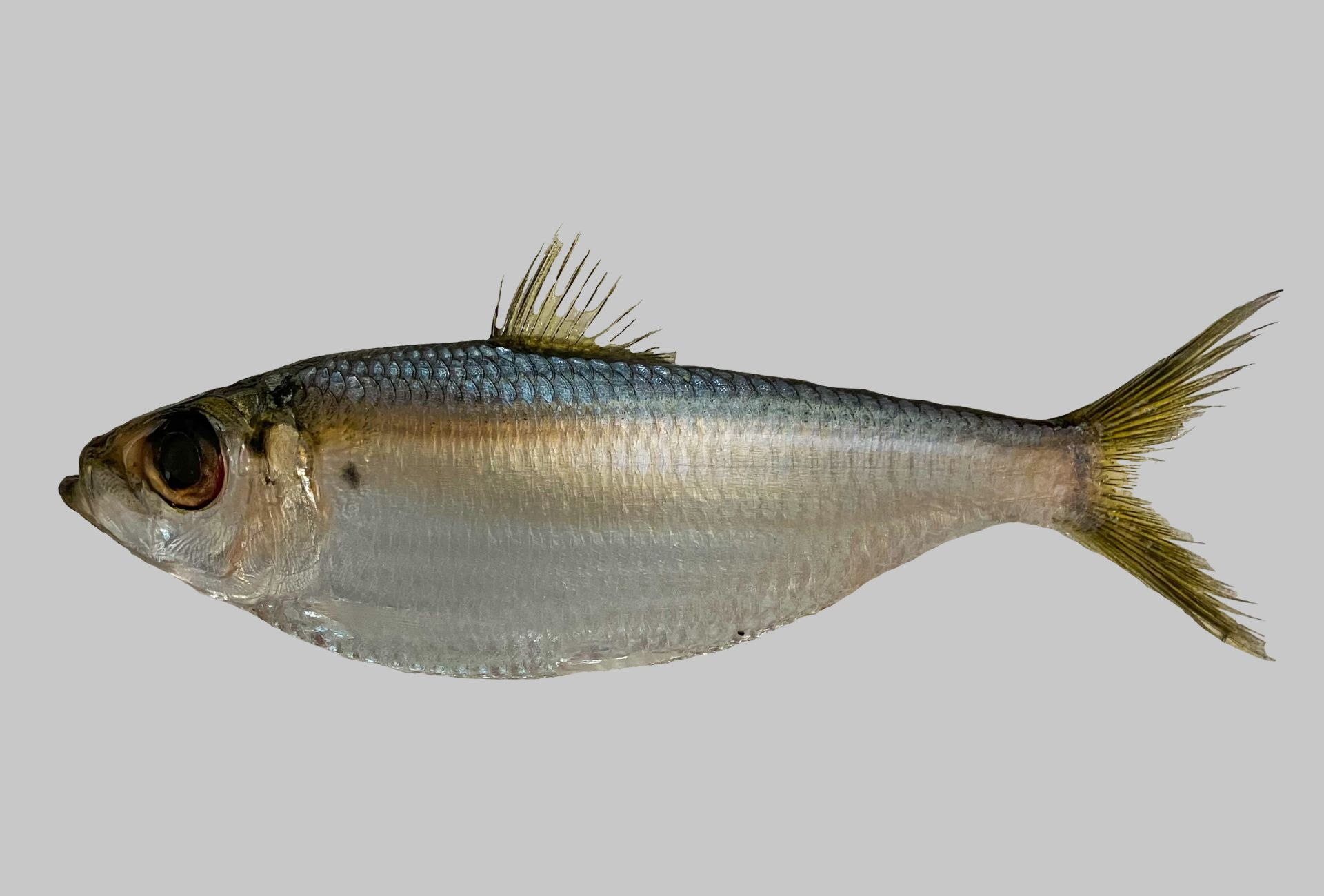

Conservation status
- Least Concern (IUCN 3.1)

Scientific classification
- Kingdom: Animalia
- Phylum: Chordata
- Class: Actinopterygii
- Order: Clupeiformes
- Family: Dorosomatidae
- Genus: Harengula
- Species: H. clupeola

Binomial name
- Harengula clupeola (Cuvier. 1829)

Synonyms
- Clupea clupeola Cuvier, 1829; Clupea macrophthalma Ranzani, 1842; Harengula latulus Valenciennes, 1847; Alosa bishopi Müller & Troschel, 1848

= Harengula clupeola =

Species of fish

Harenngula clupeola, the false herring, or false pilchard', is a species of marine ray-finned fish belonging to the family Dorosomatidae, the gizzard shads and sardinellas. The false herring is found in the Western Atlantic Ocean from eastern Florida and the Bahamas through the Gulf of Mexico south to Santa Catarina in Brazil.

== Taxonomy ==
Harengula clupeola was first formally described as Clupea clupeola in 1829 by the French zoologist Georges Cuvier with its type locality given as Martinique. In 1847 Achille Valenciennes described Harengua latulus, the first use of the genus name Harengula and in 1861 Theodore Gill designated H. latulus as the type species of the genus Harengula. H. latulus is now considered to be a junior synonym of Clupea clupeola. The genus Harengula is classified within the family Dorosomatidae which belongs to the suborder Clupeoidei in the order Clupeiformes.

== Description ==
Harengula clupeola has a slender body with a weakly curved ventral profile. The dorsal fin is supported by between 15 and 21 soft rays while the anal fin contains between 12 and 23 soft rays. There is a wide tooth plate on the tongue and another behind it, these are between 3 and 5 times as wide as their total length. The rear toothplate has a clear bulge at its front. It scales have a rather strong attachment and are not easily shed.It is a silvery fish with a dark greenish back and an indistinct yellow or light orange spot on the margin of the operculum. There is no dark tip to the dorsal fin. This species has a maximum published total length of 22.5 cm (8.9 in).

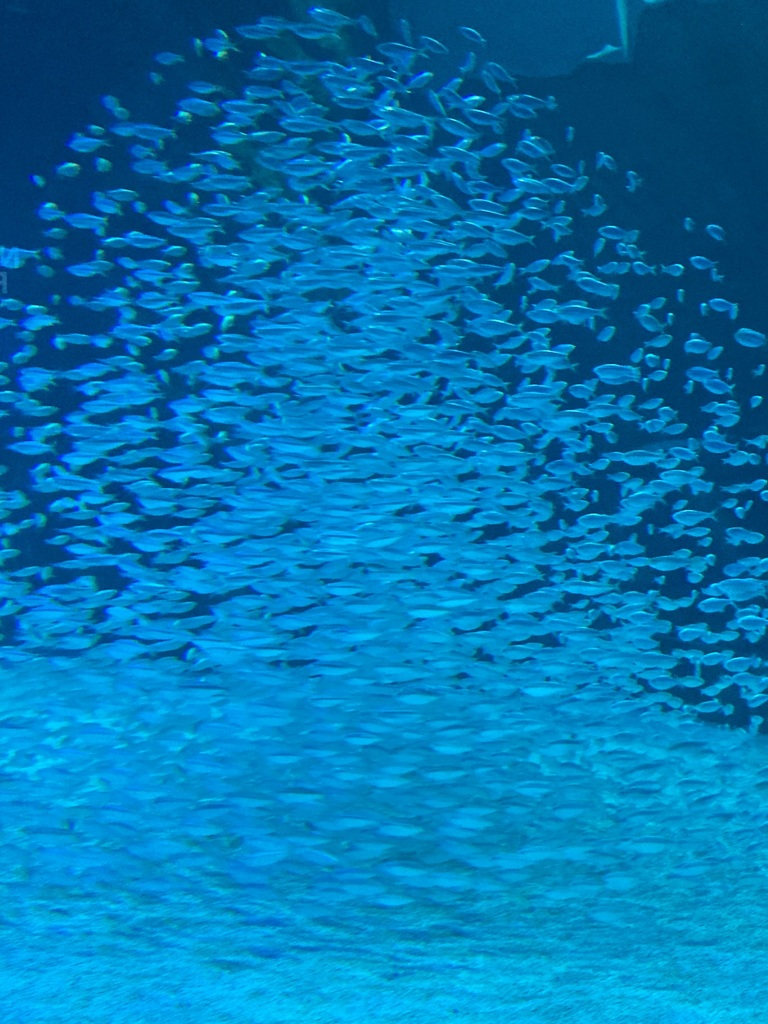
Harengula clupeola Georgia Aquarium

== Distribution and habitat ==
Harengula clupeola is found in the Western Atlantic Ocean where it occurs from eastern Florida and the Bahamas through the Gulf of Mexico, the Caribbean Sea, south to Santa Catarina in Brazil. This is a coastal, pelagic species found in estuaries and lagoons in marine and brackish waters.

== Biology ==
Harengula clupeola is a pelagic, schooling fish. It is a nocturnal predator feeding on pteropods, polychaetes, fish eggs, and zooplankton, particularly copepods. It forms schools to spawn and spawns a number of times per season.
