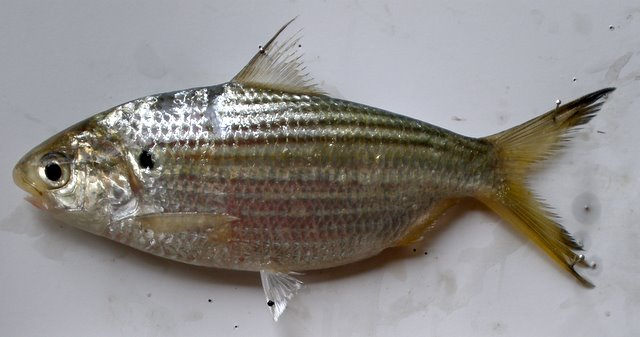
- Anodontostoma chacunda from New Caledonia

Scientific classification
- Kingdom: Animalia
- Phylum: Chordata
- Class: Actinopterygii
- Order: Clupeiformes
- Family: Dorosomatidae
- Genus: Anodontostoma
- Species: A. chacunda

Binomial name
- Anodontostoma chacunda (Hamilton, 1822)

= Anodontostoma chacunda =

Species of fish

Anodontostoma chacunda or Chacunda gizzard shad is a small species of gizzard shad found in both fresh and marine waters. The fish is from the family Clupeidae.

== Habitat ==
It is found in Indo-West Pacific area mainly from Persian Gulf to coasts of India and Andaman Sea. it has also been reported from the Gulf of Thailand, Indonesia, Vietnam, Philippines, south to northern Australia, the Caroline Islands and New Caledonia.

== Description ==
Individuals reach up to a size of 22 cm, with an average size of 14 cm .

== Ecology ==
Anodontostoma chacunda usually dwell in marine environment mainly in coastal area, at times they venture into rivers and estuaries.

== Fisheries ==
Chacunda gizzard shad is captured commercially and sold fresh or frozen, dried or dried-salted.

== Used as food ==
In Thailand, this species of shad is widely used in cooking. In Chonburi Province, which lies along the upper Gulf of Thailand (also known as the Bay of Bangkok), it is locally known as pla khok (Thai: ปลาค่ก, pronounced [plāː kʰôːk]). The fish is typically boiled and salted with pickled vegetables, a dish that reflects the influence of Teochew cuisine.

In the Songkhla Lake Basin, the fish's roe is rounded with herbs and fried in hot oil on a flat pan. This preparation is a local specialty that can only be found in Phatthalung Province.
