= Platanichthys =

Conservation status
- Least Concern (IUCN 3.1)

Scientific classification
- Kingdom: Animalia
- Phylum: Chordata
- Class: Actinopterygii
- Order: Clupeiformes
- Family: Dorosomatidae
- Genus: Platanichthys; Whitehead, 1968
- Species: P. platana

Binomial name
- Platanichthys platana (Regan, 1917)

Synonyms
- Lile platana Regan, 1917; Stolephorus otidus Ringuelet, 1942; Spratella pallida de Buen, 1952; Clupea melanostoma limnoica Alonzo de Arámburu, 1961

Species of fish

Platanichthys is a monospecific genus of ray-finned fish belonging to the family Dorosomatidae, which also includes the gizzard shads and sardinellas. The only species in the genus is Platanichthys platana, the Rio Plata sprat. This is a very small species of fish that is endemic to South America.

== Environment ==
Platanichthys platana is recorded to be found in a freshwater environment within a pelagic depth range. Although it is recorded to live in a freshwater environment, it lives in brackish water, which is defined as slightly salty water. This species is native to a subtropical climate.

== Size ==
P. platana can reach the maximum recorded length of about 6.7 centimeters or about 2.63 inches as an unsexed male. The common length of this species is about 5 centimeters or about 1.96 inches.

== Distribution ==
P. platana is recorded to occupy the areas of Rio de Janeiro, Brazi, Uruguay, and Argentina. They live more specifically in the areas of brackish waters of lagoons, estuaries, and the lower reaches of rivers.

== Notes ==
- Froese, Rainer; Pauly, Daniel (eds.). "Platanichthys platana". FishBase. June 2011 version.
