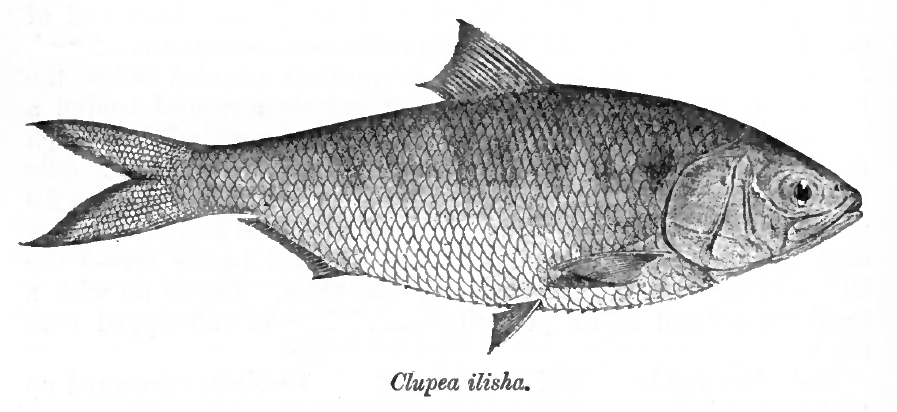
- Tenualosa ilisha

Scientific classification
- Kingdom: Animalia
- Phylum: Chordata
- Class: Actinopterygii
- Order: Clupeiformes
- Family: Dorosomatidae
- Genus: Tenualosa; Fowler, 1934

Type species
- Alosa reevesii J. Richardson,1846

Species
- 5 species (see text)

Synonyms
- Hilsa (Tenualosa) Fowler, 1934; Tennalosa – misspelling

= Tenualosa =

Genus of fishes

Tenualosa is a genus of ray-finned fish belonging to the family Dorosomatidae, which also includes the gizzard shads and sardinellas. These fishes are found in rivers, brackish waters and coasts in the Indo-Pacific region.

== Species ==
There are currently five recognized species in this genus:

- Tenualosa ilisha (F. Hamilton, 1822) (Hilsa shad)
- Tenualosa macrura (Bleeker, 1852) (Longtail shad)
- Tenualosa reevesii (J. Richardson, 1846) (Reeves' shad)
- Tenualosa thibaudeaui (J. Durand, 1940) (Laotian shad)
- Tenualosa toli (Valenciennes, 1847) (Toli shad)
