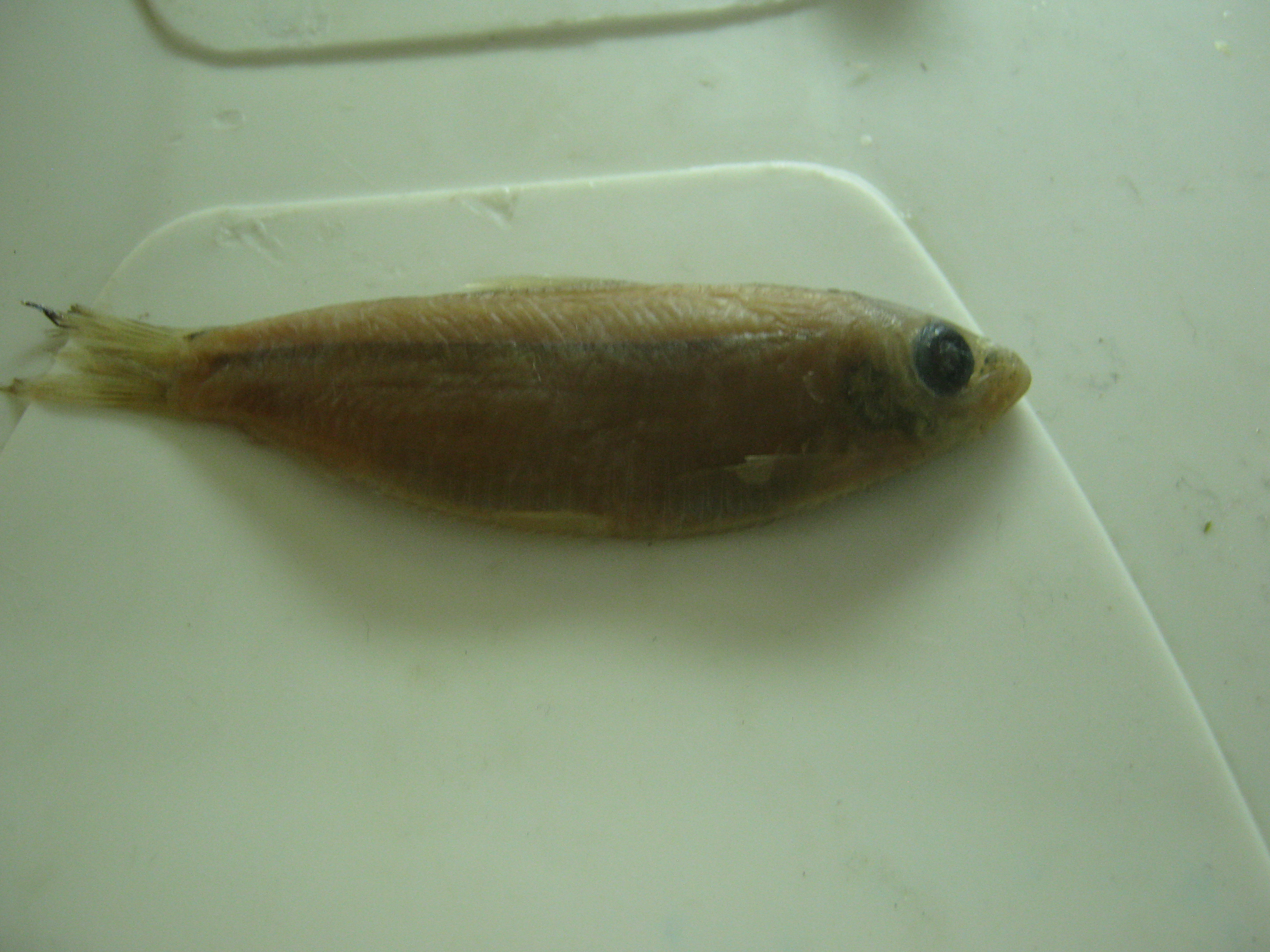
- Lile stolifera

Scientific classification
- Kingdom: Animalia
- Phylum: Chordata
- Class: Actinopterygii
- Order: Clupeiformes
- Family: Dorosomatidae
- Genus: Lile; D. S. Jordan & Evermann, 1896

Type species
- Clupea stolifera D. S. Jordan & Gilbert, 1882

= Lile (fish) =

Genus of fishes

Lile, the piquitingas, is a genus of small fish belonging to the family Dorosomatidae, which includes the gizzard shads and sardinellas. They are endemic to the Americas. There are currently four recognized species in the genus.

== Species ==
- Lile gracilis Castro-Aguirre & Vivero, 1990 (Graceful piquitinga)
- Lile nigrofasciata Castro-Aguirre, Ruiz-Campos & Balart, 2002 (Blackstripe herring)
- Lile piquitinga (Schreiner & A. Miranda-Ribeiro, 1903) (Atlantic piquitinga)
- Lile stolifera (D. S. Jordan & C. H. Gilbert, 1882) (Pacific piquitinga)
