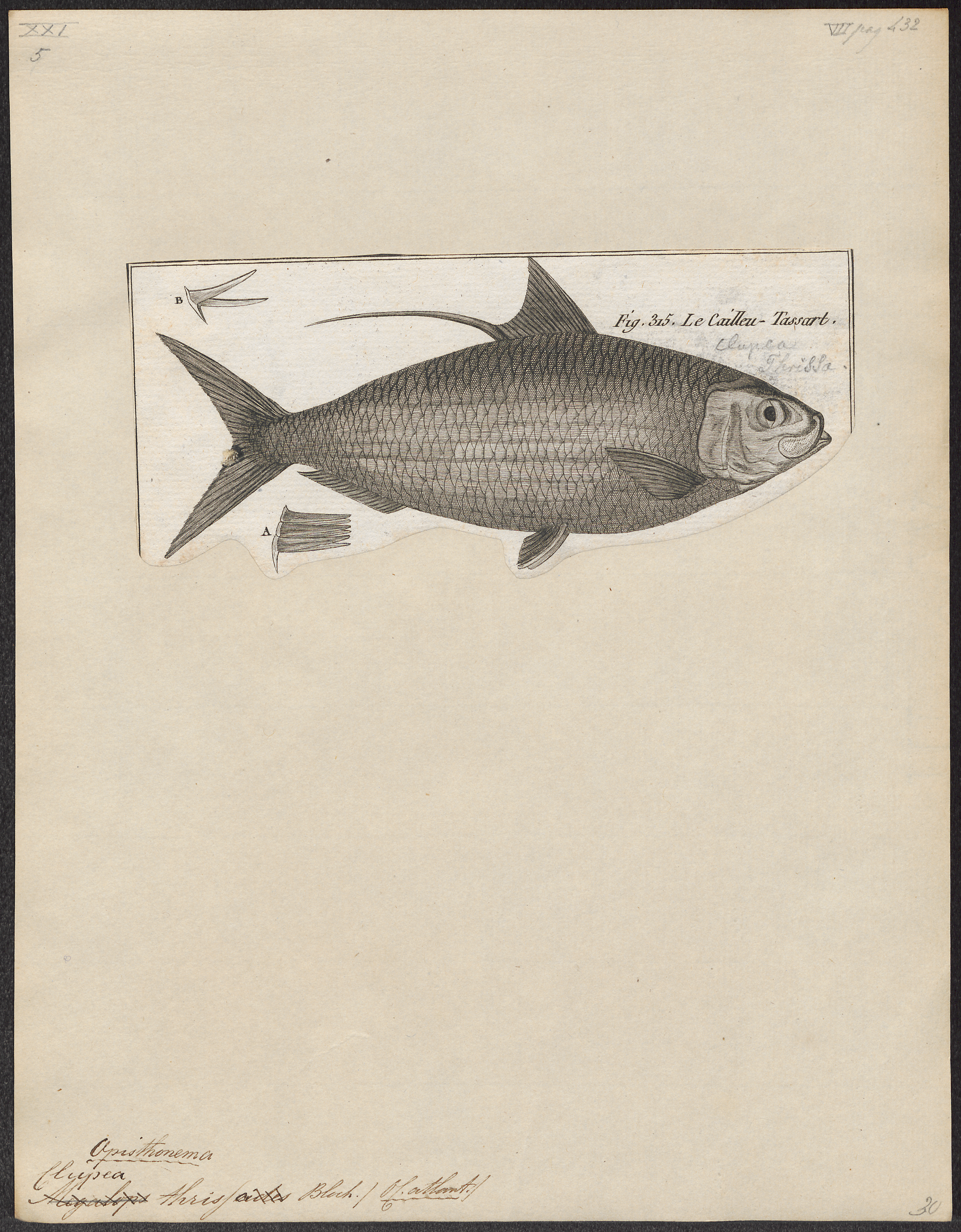

Conservation status
- Least Concern (IUCN 3.1)

Scientific classification
- Kingdom: Animalia
- Phylum: Chordata
- Class: Actinopterygii
- Order: Clupeiformes
- Family: Dorosomatidae
- Genus: Clupanodon; Lacépède, 1803
- Species: C. thrissa

Binomial name
- Clupanodon thrissa (Linnaeus, 1758)

= Clupanodon =

Clupanodon Temporal range: Pleistocene–present

Species of fish

Clupanodon thrissa, the Chinese gizzard shad, is a species of gizzard shad from the Northwest Pacific, occurring from Korea to Thailand and possibly the Philippines. It is the only extant species currently recognized in its genus. A second, fossil species, †Clupanodon tanegashimaensis (Saheki, 1929) is known from the Pleistocene of Japan.
