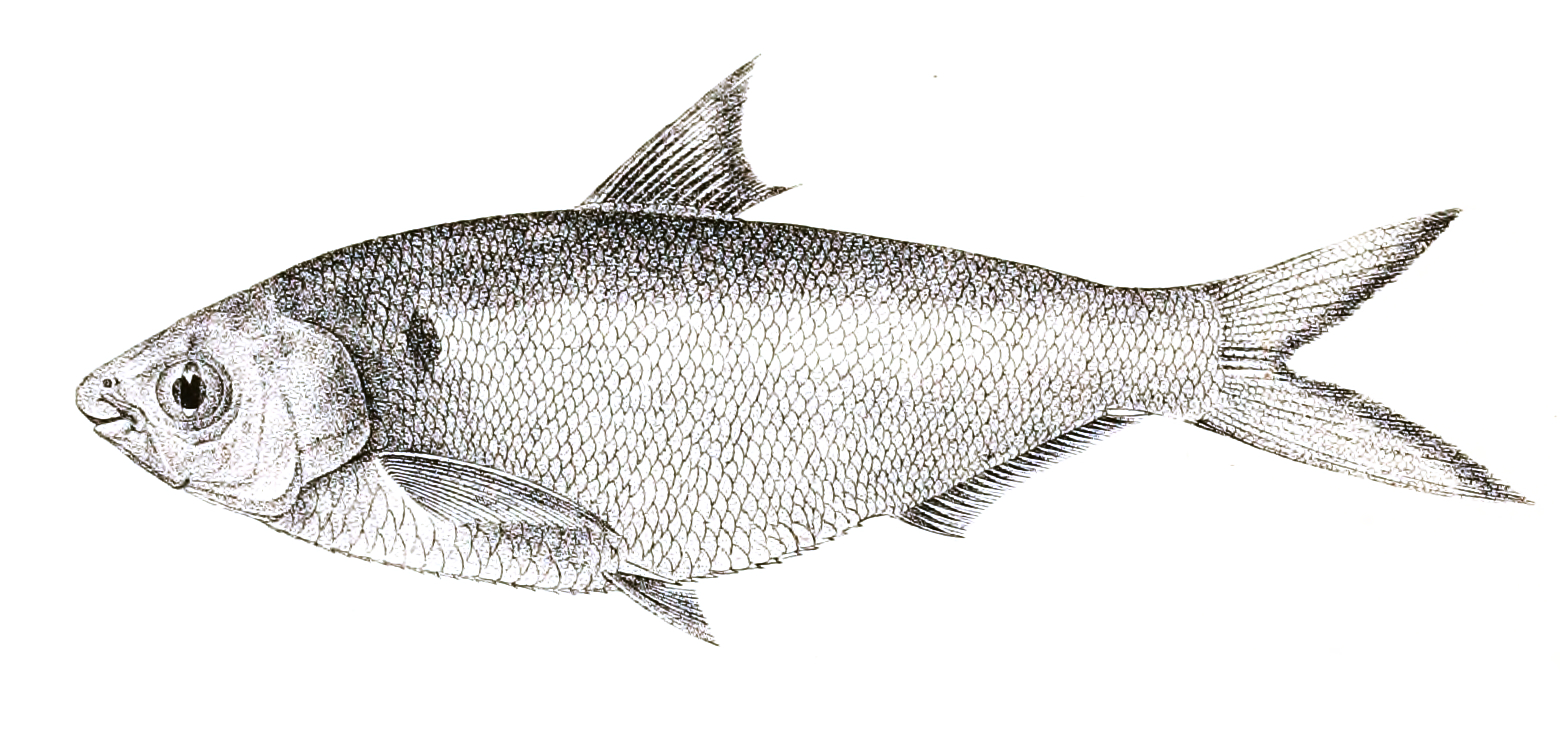
- Gonialosa manmina
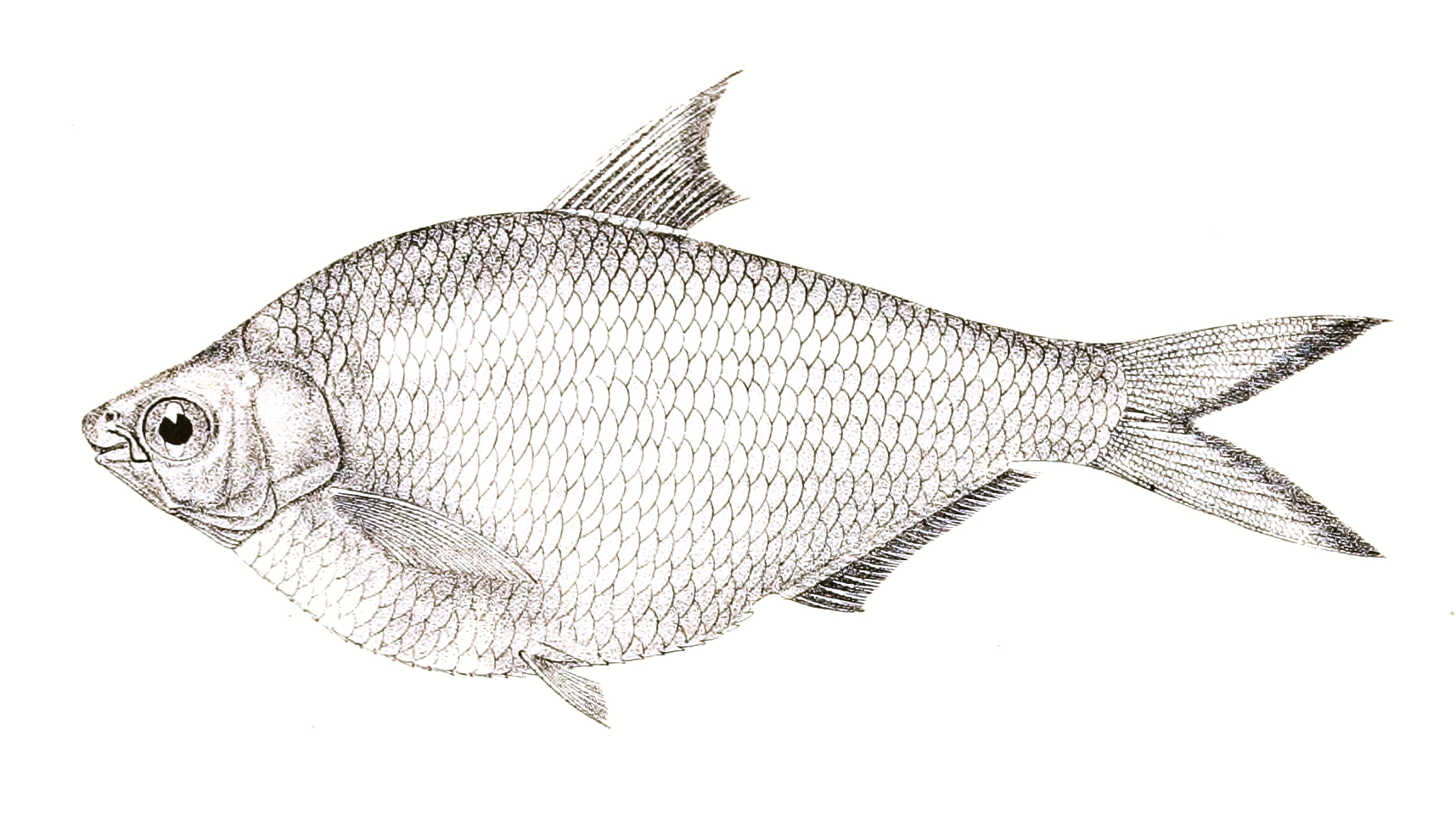
- Gonialosa modesta

Scientific classification
- Kingdom: Animalia
- Phylum: Chordata
- Class: Actinopterygii
- Order: Clupeiformes
- Family: Dorosomatidae
- Genus: Gonialosa; Regan, 1917

Type species
- Chatoessus modestus F. Day 1870

Synonyms
- Indialosa Herre & Myers, 1931

= Gonialosa =

Genus of fishes

Gonialosa is a genus of gizzard shads that are found in the rivers of South and Southeast Asia. There are currently three described species.

== Species ==
- Gonialosa manmina (F. Hamilton, 1822) (Ganges river gizzard shad)
- Gonialosa modesta (F. Day, 1870) (Burmese river gizzard shad)
- Gonialosa whiteheadi Wongratana, 1983 (Southern Burmese river gizzard shad)
