= Araucanian herring =

Conservation status
- Least Concern (IUCN 3.1)

Scientific classification
- Kingdom: Animalia
- Phylum: Chordata
- Class: Actinopterygii
- Division: Teleostei
- Order: Clupeiformes
- Family: Dorosomatidae
- Genus: Strangomera; Whitehead, 1965
- Species: S. bentincki

Binomial name
- Strangomera bentincki (Norman, 1936)

Synonyms
- Clupea bentincki Norman, 1936

Species of fish

The Araucanian herring (Strangomera bentincki) is a species of fish in the family Dorosomatidae. It is an epipelagic fish, silvery below and dark blue above, which schools in coastal waters off the west coast of South America. It ranges along the Chilean coast from Valparaíso south to Talcahuano. It schools at depths from 0 to 70 metres (0 to 230 ft) in nearshore areas.

There it filter feeds on smaller plankton such as diatoms. It reaches sexual maturity when it is about 10 centimetres (3.9 in) long, and is a pelagic spawner, spawning between June and November. It grows to a maximum standard length of 15 cm (5.9 in).

== Fisheries ==
The Araucanian herring is a commercial species, largely used for fishmeal. Based on the FAO fishery statistics, it was the 12th most important capture fish species in 2009. All reported landings are from Chile.

Global capture production of Araucanian herring (Strangomera bentincki) in thousand tonnes from 1950 to 2022, as reported by the FAO

== Literature ==
- Castilla, Juan Carlos (2010). "Fisheries in Chile: small pelagics, management, rights, and sea zoning". Bulletin of Marine Science. 86: 221–234.
- Gómez-Lobo, Andrés; Peña-Torres, Julio; Barría, Patricio (2010). "ITQ's in Chile: Measuring the Economic Benefits of Reform" (PDF). Environmental and Resource Economics. 48 (4): 651–678. doi:10.1007/s10640-010-9419-9. S2CID 54719866.
- Whitehead PJP; Nelson GJ; Wongratana T, eds. (1988). Clupeoid Fishes of the World (Suborder Clupeoidei) FAO Fisheries Synopsis No. 125 (PDF). FAO species catalogue. Vol. 7. Rome. pp. 130–131. ISBN 92-5-102340-9.
