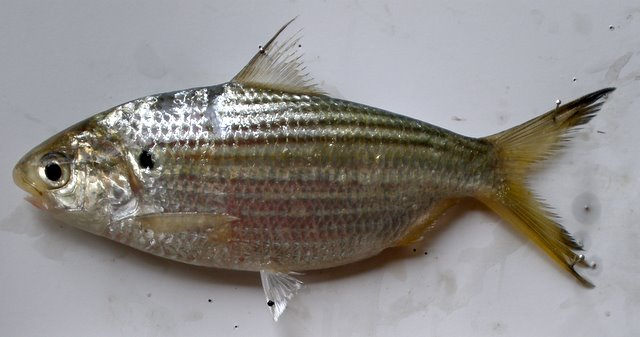
- Anodontostoma chacunda from New Caledonia

Scientific classification
- Domain: Eukaryota
- Kingdom: Animalia
- Phylum: Chordata
- Class: Actinopterygii
- Order: Clupeiformes
- Family: Dorosomatidae
- Genus: Anodontostoma; Bleeker, 1849

Type species
- Anodontostoma hasseltii Bleeker, 1849

= Anodontostoma =

Genus of fishes

Anodontostoma is a small genus of gizzard shads found in the Indo-Pacific region. It currently contains three described species.

== Species ==
- Anodontostoma chacunda (F. Hamilton, 1822) (Chacunda gizzard shad)
- Anodontostoma selangkat (Bleeker, 1852) (Indonesian gizzard shad)
- Anodontostoma thailandiae Wongratana, 1983 (Thai gizzard shad)
