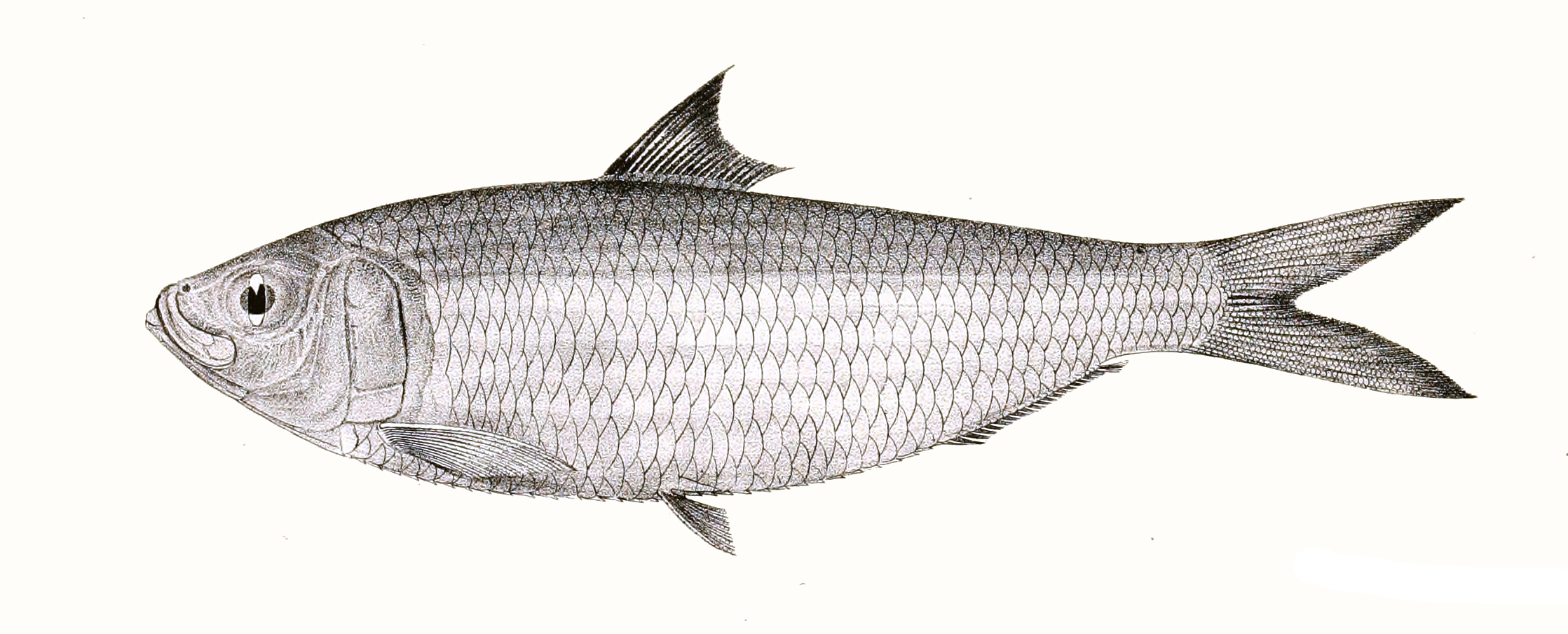

Conservation status
- Least Concern (IUCN 3.1)

Scientific classification
- Kingdom: Animalia
- Phylum: Chordata
- Class: Actinopterygii
- Order: Clupeiformes
- Family: Dorosomatidae
- Genus: Ethmalosa; Regan, 1917
- Species: E. fimbriata

Binomial name
- Ethmalosa fimbriata (S. Bowdich, 1825)

Synonyms
- Clupea fimbriata Bowdich, 1825; Alausa dorsalis Valenciennes, 1847; Clupea dorsalis (Valenciennes, 1847); Ethmalosa dorsalis (Valenciennes, 1847); Harengula forsteri Valenciennes, 1847; Meletta senegalensis Valenciennes, 1847; Clupea senegalensis (Valenciennes, 1847); Alausa platycephalus Bleeker, 1863; Clupea setosa Steindachner, 1869

= Ethmalosa =

Species of fish

Ethmalosa fimbriata, the bonga shad or just bonga, is a shad-like ray-finned fish, belonging to the family Dorosomatidae, formerly considered to be in the family Clupeidae. This species occurs along the coasts and in brackish water of coastal lagoons, rivers and lakes of western Africa from Dakhla in Western Sahara to Lobito in Angola. It is usually around 25 cm long but the maximum length is 45 cm. It is the only member of its genus.

== Fishery ==
Global capture production of Bonga shad (Ethmalosa fimbriata) in thousand tonnes from 1950 to 2022, as reported by the FAO

Bonga is caught by inshore small-scale fisheries using seine fishing from a boat or by beach seine. It may also be caught by gill net.

== Use in fish meal ==
Bonga is also used to make fish meal, a powder which is exported around the world and used to feed farmed fish in places like Norway and China. The practice is controversial in countries like The Gambia, where environmentalists say over-fishing of bonga for fish meal is raising prices for locals. Refuse from fish meal plants has also been linked to environmental damage.

== Food ==
Bonga is very important in West African coastal and lagoon fishing communities and it is an important food source in West and Central Africa. It is usually smoke-dried for 2 to 5 days, depending on size and on the market. Smoke-drying is done over a fire. The fish is placed on sticks, bars or wire mesh trays about 1 m from the floor. A fire is lit on the floor and the fish is first cooked over a high fire, then the fire is reduced to a smoldering fire which is kept going for as long as necessary. Smoking "ovens" can be open without walls or closed with walls either in the outside air or inside a smoke house. A hard-smoked bonga can be kept for several months in ambient conditions.

Smoke-drying of fish is essentially a drying process to preserve the product in the absence of refrigeration. It is different from fish smoking as it is known in Europe, USA, Canada, etc., where it is applied to impart taste, such as smoked salmon (cold smoked) or smoked eel (hot smoked) which must be stored under refrigeration.

== See also ==
- List of smoked foods
