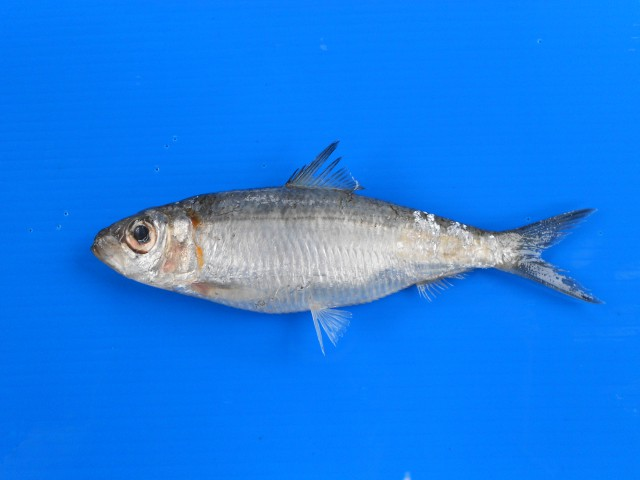

Conservation status
- Least Concern (IUCN 3.1)

Scientific classification
- Kingdom: Animalia
- Phylum: Chordata
- Class: Actinopterygii
- Order: Clupeiformes
- Family: Dorosomatidae
- Genus: Herklotsichthys
- Species: H. quadrimaculatus

Binomial name
- Herklotsichthys quadrimaculatus (Rüppell, 1837)

Synonyms
- Clupea quadrimaculata Rüppell, 1837

= Herklotsichthys quadrimaculatus =

Species of fish

Herklotsichthys quadrimaculatus, also known as the bluestripe herring, is a species of ray-finned fish in the family Dorosomatidae. It is widespread in the Indian Ocean and the western Pacific Ocean. Other names for the species include goldspot sardine and fourspot herring. It can grow to a maximum standard length 25 cm (9.8 in), although its typical length is less than half of that.
