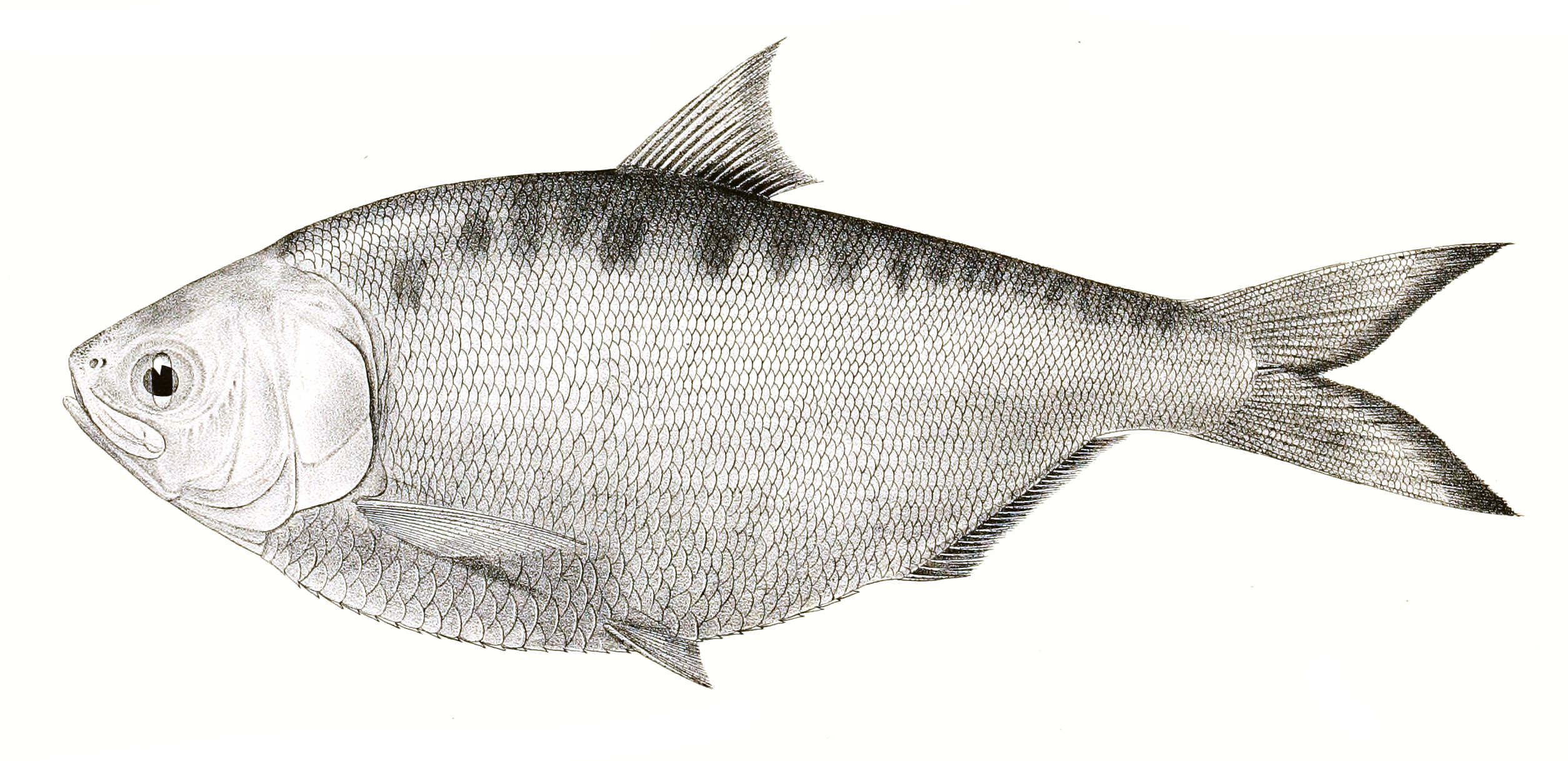
- Gudusia variegata

Scientific classification
- Kingdom: Animalia
- Phylum: Chordata
- Class: Actinopterygii
- Order: Clupeiformes
- Family: Dorosomatidae
- Genus: Gudusia; Fowler, 1911

Type species
- Clupanodon chapra F. Hamilton, 1822

= Gudusia =

Genus of fishes

Gudusia is a genus of freshwater ray-finned fishes belonging to the family Dorosomatidae, the gizzard shads and sardinellas. The fishes in this genus are found in rivers in southern Asia.

== Species ==
Gudusia contains the following species:

- Gudusia chapra (F. Hamilton, 1822) (Indian river shad)
- Gudusia variegata (F. Day, 1870) (Burmese river shad)
