= Ramnogaster =

Scientific classification
- Kingdom: Animalia
- Phylum: Chordata
- Class: Actinopterygii
- Division: Teleostei
- Order: Clupeiformes
- Family: Dorosomatidae
- Genus: Ramnogaster; Whitehead, 1965

Type species
- Clupea arcuata Jenyns, 1842

Genus of fishes

Ramnogaster is a small genus of sprats found only in South America. Two species are placed in this genus:

- Ramnogaster arcuata (Jenyns, 1842) (Jenyns's sprat)
- Ramnogaster melanostoma (C. H. Eigenmann, 1907) (Uruguay river sprat)
