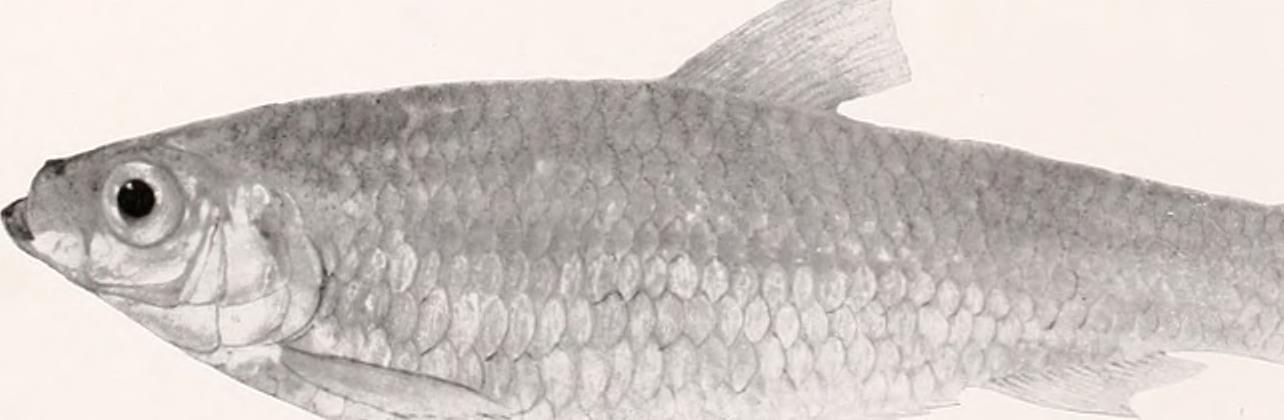
- R. amazonica

Scientific classification
- Domain: Eukaryota
- Kingdom: Animalia
- Phylum: Chordata
- Class: Actinopterygii
- Order: Clupeiformes
- Family: Dorosomatidae
- Genus: Rhinosardinia; C. H. Eigenmann, 1912

Type species
- Rhinosardinia serrata Eigenmann, 1912

Synonyms
- Heringia Fowler, 1911

= Rhinosardinia =

Genus of fishes

Rhinosardinia is a small genus of sprats restricted to the rivers of South America. There are currently only two described species in the genus.

== Species ==
- Rhinosardinia amazonica (Steindachner, 1879) (Amazon spinejaw sprat)
- Rhinosardinia bahiensis (Steindachner, 1879) (Bahia sprat)
