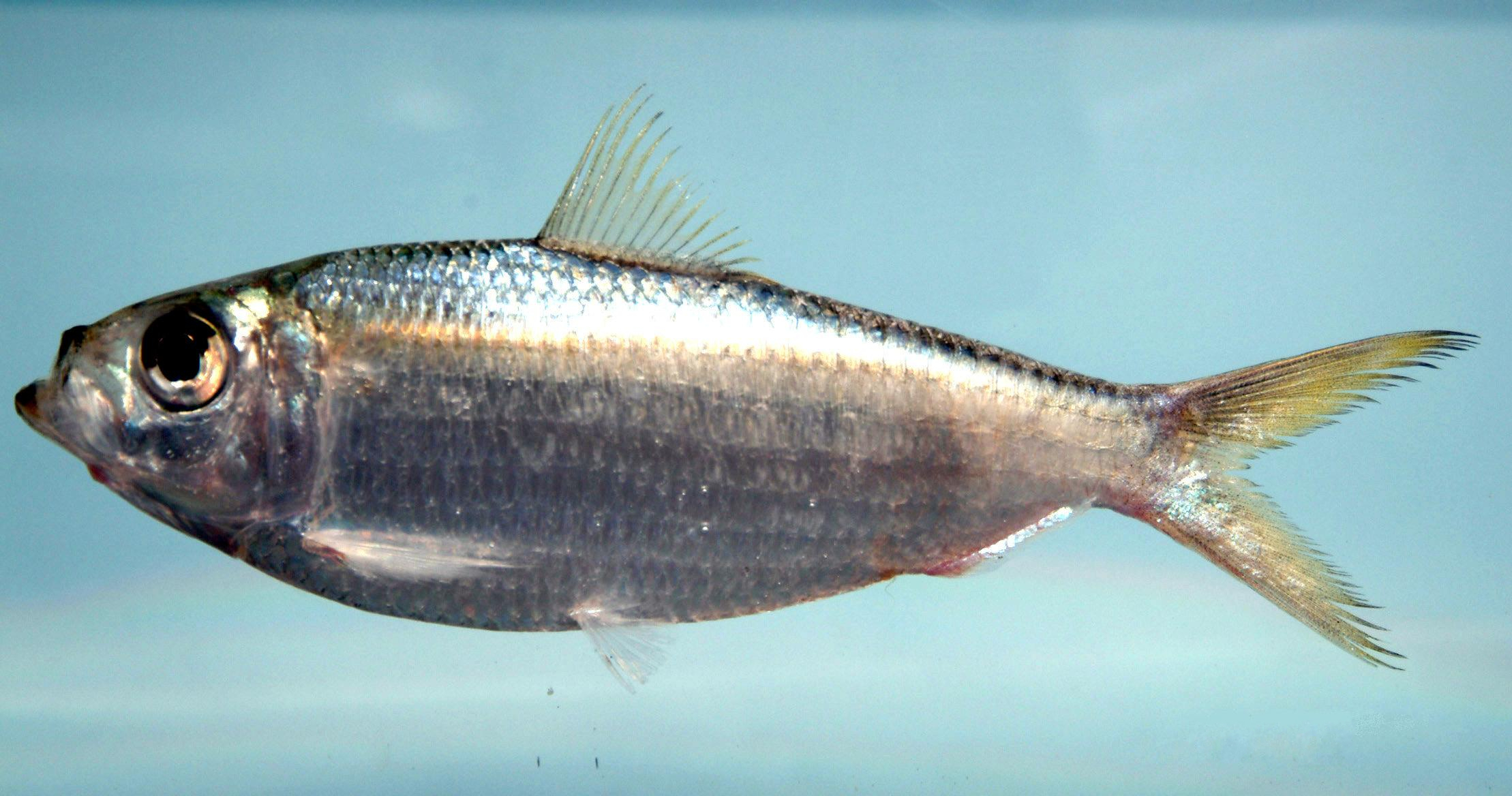
- Scaled sardine (Harengula jaguana)

Scientific classification
- Kingdom: Animalia
- Phylum: Chordata
- Class: Actinopterygii
- Order: Clupeiformes
- Family: Dorosomatidae
- Genus: Harengula; Valenciennes, 1847

Type species
- Harengula latulus Valenciennes, 1847

Synonyms
- Hyrtlinus Fowler, 1958

= Harengula =

Genus of fishes

Harengula is a genus of marine ray-finned fishes belonging to the family Dorosomatidae, the gizzard shads and sarinellas/ The fishes in this genus occur mostly in the western Atlantic, Gulf of Mexico and the Caribbean Sea, with one species in the eastern Pacific Ocean. There are currently four described species.

== Species ==
Harengula has the following species classified within it:

- Harengula clupeola (Cuvier, 1829) (False herring)
- Harengula humeralis (Cuvier, 1829) (Redear herring)
- Harengula jaguana Poey, 1865 (Scaled herring)
- Harengula thrissina (D. S. Jordan & C. H. Gilbert, 1882) (Pacific flatiron herring)
