= Jan Adrianus Herklots =

Dutch zoologist

- Born: 17 August 1820; Middelburg
- Died: 31 March 1872 (aged 51); Zoeterwoude
- Citizenship: Dutch
- Education: University of Leiden
- Scientific career
- Fields: carcinologist, zoologist
- Workplaces: Rijksmuseum van Natuurlijke Historie
- Author abbrev. (zoology): Herklots

Jan Adrianus Herklots (born 17 August 1820 in Middelburg, Zeeland; died 31 March 1872 in Zoeterwoude) was a Dutch zoologist whose main areas of research were carcinology and the echinoderms.

Herklots studied medicine and biology at the University of Leiden. In 1846 he was appointed as curator of invertebrates at the Rijksmuseum van Natuurlijke Historie in Leiden, succeeding Wilhem de Haan, a position which he held until his death in 1872, his successor was Christiaan Karel Hoffmann.

In June 1851 he graduated as a Doctor of Philosophy, and his dissertation was entitled Additamenta ad faunam carcinologicam Africa occidentalis on the crustaceans from the Guinea coast, based on samples brought to the Netherlands by Hendrik Pel. In 1861 he published a museum catalogue of crustaceans from the system of Wilhem de Haan. He was also the author of important works on coelenterates, especially sea pens (Pennatulacea), and both modern and fossil taxa of echinoderms.

In 1854 the Museum established its divided the Department of Invertebrates into a Department of Non-Articulata, of which Herklots remained the curator and a Department of Articulata where Samuel Constantinus Snellen van Vollenhoven (1816-1880) was curator. In July 1860, the Department of Invertebrates was reorganized and van Vollenhoven became head of the entomological department, while Herklots became head of Arthropoda Non-Insecta, the position he held until his death.

Herklots provided important contributions on invertebrate animals. His work was somewhat overshadowed by that of de Haan. However, in contrast to De Haan, Herklots was very interested in the Dutch invertebrate fauna. The Natural History Museum in Leiden has several invertebrate specimens collected by Herklots on Noordwijk beach. Herklots married Antoinetta Johanna Agatha Susanna, the daughter of the former museum director Joannes Andreas Susanna.

Herklots was a member of the Royal Netherlands Academy of Sciences, the Dutch Society of Sciences in Haarlem, and several other learned societies.

He died in 1872 after a long illness, probably tuberculosis.

== Selected works ==
- Herklots, J. A., 1853 Bouwstoffen voor eene fauna van Nederland, onder medewerking van onderscheidene geleerden en beoefenaars der dierkunde, bijeenverzameld door J. A. Herklots. E. J. Brill, Leiden
- Herklots, J.A., 1858. Notices pour servir à l'étude des polypiers nageurs ou pennatulides. Bijdragen tot de Dierkunde 7: 1-31
- Herklots, J.A., 1863. Descriptions de deux espèces nouvelles de pennatulides des Mers de la Chine. Nederlandsch Tijdschrift voor de Dierkunde 1: 31-34

== Taxa named after Herklots ==
The slipper lobster Scyllarides herklotsii was described by Herklots in his doctoral thesis at the University of Leiden. The Indo-Pacific herring genus Herklotsichthys is named after Herklots.
