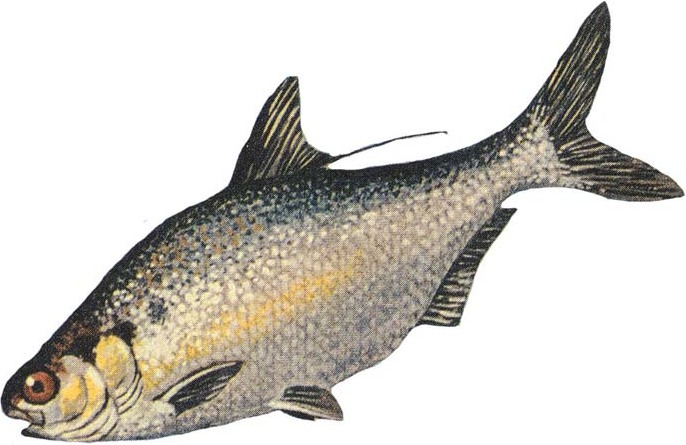
- Dorosoma cepedianum

Scientific classification
- Domain: Eukaryota
- Kingdom: Animalia
- Phylum: Chordata
- Class: Actinopterygii
- Order: Clupeiformes
- Family: Dorosomatidae
- Genus: Dorosoma; Rafinesque, 1820

Type species
- Dorosoma notata Rafinesque, 1820

Species
- See text

= Dorosoma =

Genus of fishes

Dorosoma is a genus that contains five species of shads, within the family Dorosomatidae. The five species are native to the North and/or Central America, and are mostly known from fresh water, though some may reside in the waters of estuaries and bays.

The American gizzard shad is important to the food web in America due to being a source of game fish food. They also have a long history of stock introductions that can lead to disruptions to the food web.

== Species ==
- Dorosoma anale Meek, 1904 (Mexican river gizzard shad)
- Dorosoma cepedianum (Lesueur, 1818) (American gizzard shad)
- Dorosoma chavesi Meek, 1907 (Nicaragua gizzard shad)
- Dorosoma petenense (Günther, 1867) (threadfin shad)
- Dorosoma smithi C. L. Hubbs & R. R. Miller, 1941 (Pacific gizzard shad)
