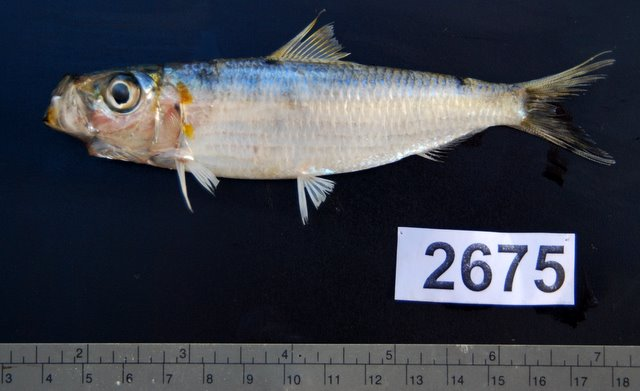
- Herklotsichthys quadrimaculatus from New Caledonia

Scientific classification
- Kingdom: Animalia
- Phylum: Chordata
- Class: Actinopterygii
- Order: Clupeiformes
- Family: Dorosomatidae
- Genus: Herklotsichthys; Whitley, 1951

Type species
- Harengula dispilonotus Bleeker, 1852

Synonyms
- Herklotsella Fowler, 1934

= Herklotsichthys =

Genus of herrings

Herklotsichthys is a genus of herrings in the family Dorosomatidae found mostly around Southeast Asia and Australia with one species each in the Persian Gulf, the Red Sea, and the western Indian Ocean. This genus currently contains 12 species.

Well-preserved fossil remains of this genus are known from the early Pleistocene-aged Laguna Formation of the Philippines.

== Species ==
- Herklotsichthys blackburni (Whitley, 1948) (Blackburn's herring)
- Herklotsichthys castelnaui (J. D. Ogilby, 1897) (Castelnau's herring)
- Herklotsichthys collettei Wongratana, 1987 (Collette's herring)
- Herklotsichthys dispilonotus (Bleeker, 1852) (Blacksaddle herring)
- Herklotsichthys gotoi Wongratana, 1983 (Goto's herring)
- Herklotsichthys koningsbergeri (M. C. W. Weber & de Beaufort, 1912) (Koningsberger's herring)
- Herklotsichthys lippa (Whitley, 1931) (Australian spotted herring)
- Herklotsichthys lossei Wongratana, 1983 (Gulf herring)
- Herklotsichthys ovalis (Anonymous referred to E. T. Bennett, 1830)
- Herklotsichthys punctatus (Rüppell, 1837) (Spotback herring)
- Herklotsichthys quadrimaculatus (Rüppell, 1837) (Bluestripe herring)
- Herklotsichthys spilurus (Guichenot, 1863) (Reunion herring)
