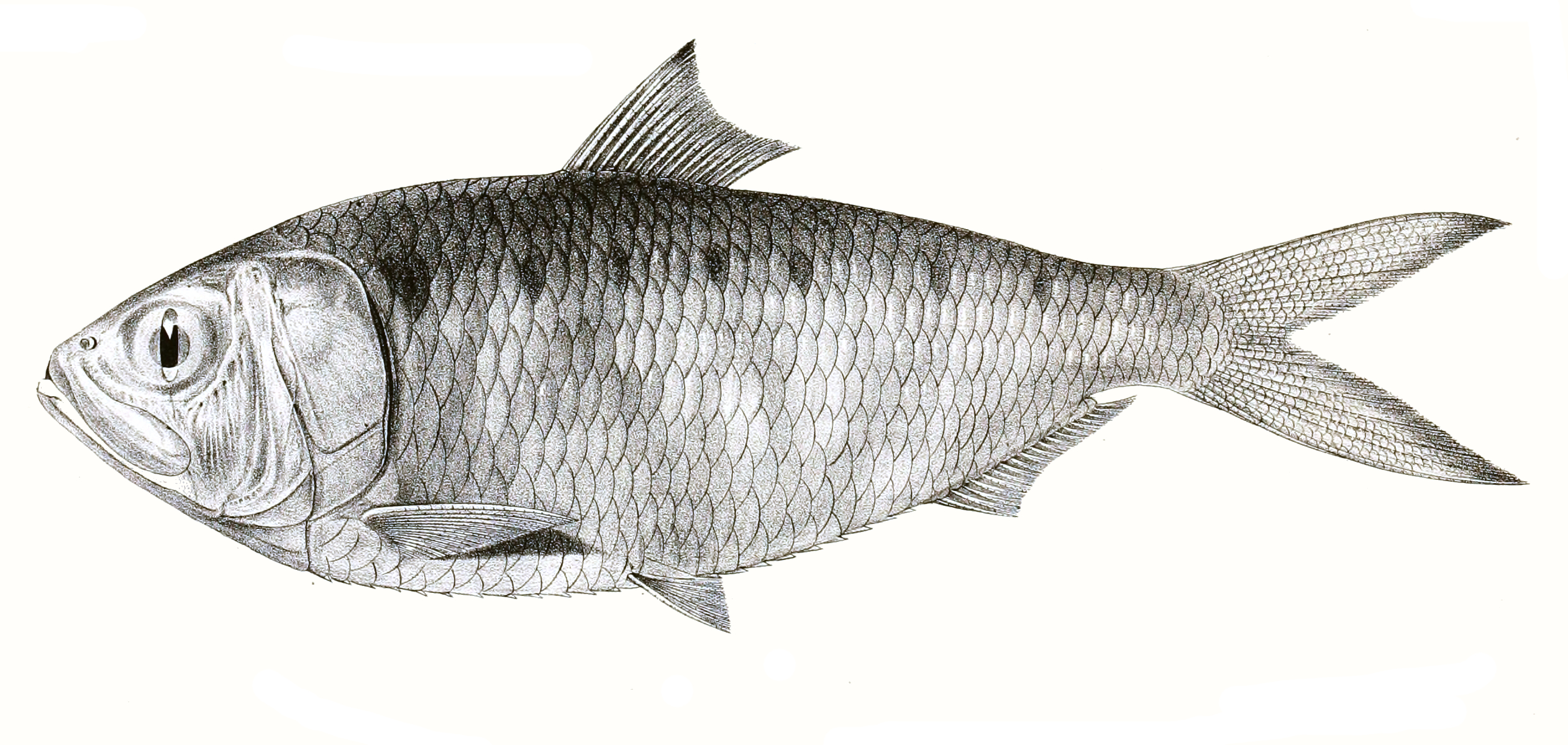

Conservation status
- Least Concern (IUCN 3.1)

Scientific classification
- Kingdom: Animalia
- Phylum: Chordata
- Class: Actinopterygii
- Order: Clupeiformes
- Family: Dorosomatidae
- Genus: Hilsa; Regan, 1917
- Species: H. kelee

Binomial name
- Hilsa kelee (Cuvier, 1829)

Synonyms
- List: Alausa brachysoma Bleeker, 1854; Alausa kanagurta Bleeker, 1852; Alosa brevis Bleeker, 1848; Alosa malayana Bleeker, 1866; Clupea durbanensis Regan, 1906; Clupea kanagurta (Bleeker, 1852); Clupea kelee Cuvier, 1829; Clupea platygaster Günther, 1868; Clupeonia blochii Valenciennes, 1847; Harengula zeylanica Hubrecht, 1879; Hilsa keele (Cuvier, 1829) (lapsus); Hilsa keelee (Cuvier, 1829) (lapsus); Hilsa kanagurta (Bleeker, 1852); Hilsa kanakurta (Bleeker, 1852) (lapsus); Macrura brevis (Bleeker, 1848); Macrura kelee (Cuvier, 1829); Tenualosa kelee (Cuvier, 1829)

= Hilsa kelee =

Species of fish

Hilsa kelee, called the kelee shad, fivespot herring, hilsa, ilish and the razorbelly, is a species of marine ray-finned fish belonging to the family Dorosomatidae, which includes the gizzard shads and sardinellas. This fish is found along the coasts and estuaries of the Indian Ocean and the western Pacific, generally in tropical waters in the Bay of Bengal. It feeds on diatoms and dinoflagellates, and any other small plankton that it can trap in its gill rakers. Some individuals can reach 35 cm, but most are around 16.5 cm. Hilsa kelee is currently considered the only species in the genus Hilsa, although other species have been included in the genus previously.
