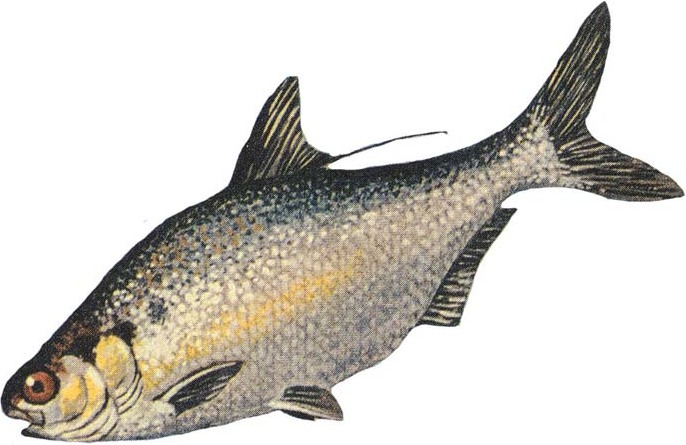
- Dorosoma cepedianum

Scientific classification
- Kingdom: Animalia
- Phylum: Chordata
- Class: Actinopterygii
- Division: Teleostei
- Order: Clupeiformes
- Suborder: Clupeoidei
- Family: Dorosomatidae; Gill, 1861

Genera
- see text

= Dorosomatidae =

Dorosomatidae Temporal range: Early Eocene to present

Family of ray-finned fishes

Dorosomatidae is a family of clupeiform fishes. It is now recognized by FishBase as a family in its own right; it had been considered to be a subfamily of Clupeidae. It can primarily be distinguished only by phylogenetic analyses, though some minor shared morphological traits, such as the structure of the gill rakers and fins, have been identified. It contains the majority of tropical and subtropical clupeoid genera. It contains 31 extant genera.

== Genera ==
Dorosomatidae contains the following genera:

- Amblygaster Bleeker, 1849
- Anodontostoma Bleeker, 1849
- Clupanodon Lacépède, 1803
- Dorosoma Rafinesque, 1820
- Escualosa Whitley, 1940
- Ethmalosa Regan, 1917
- Gonialosa Regan, 1917
- Gudusia Fowler, 1911
- Harengula Valenciennes, 1847
- Herklotsichthys Whitley, 1951
- Hilsa Regan, 1917
- Konosirus D. S. Jordan & Snyder, 1900
- Lile D. S. Jordan & Evermann, 1896
- Nematalosa Regan, 1917
- Opisthonema Gill, 1861
- Platanichthys Whitehead, 1968
- Ramnogaster Whitehead, 1965
- Rhinosardinia C. H. Eigenmann, 1912
- Sardinella Valenciennes, 1847
- Strangomera Whitehead, 1965
- Tenualosa Fowler, 1934

=== Fossil genera ===
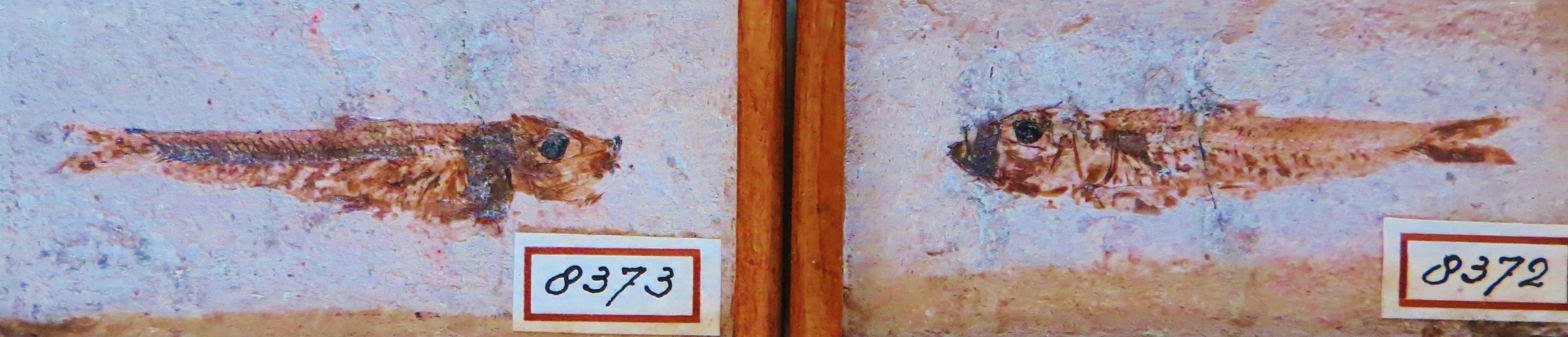
Fossil specimen of Bolcaichthys, an early stem group-dorosomatid

The following fossil genera are also known:

- †Bolcaichthys Marramà & Carnevale, 2015 (Early Eocene of Italy)
- †Chasmoclupea Murray, Simons & Attia, 2005 (Early Oligocene of Egypt)

Both these genera were originally assigned to the Clupeidae, with Chasmoclupea potentially being considered an alosid. However, due to some shared morphological characteristics, they have been reclassified into the Dorosomatidae. Due to a lack of distinguishing traits, Bolcaichthys is considered a stem group dorosomatid, while Chasmoclupea is a crown group dorosomatid potentially sister to Rhinosardinia.
