= Sardine =

Common name for various small, oily forage fish

Sardines

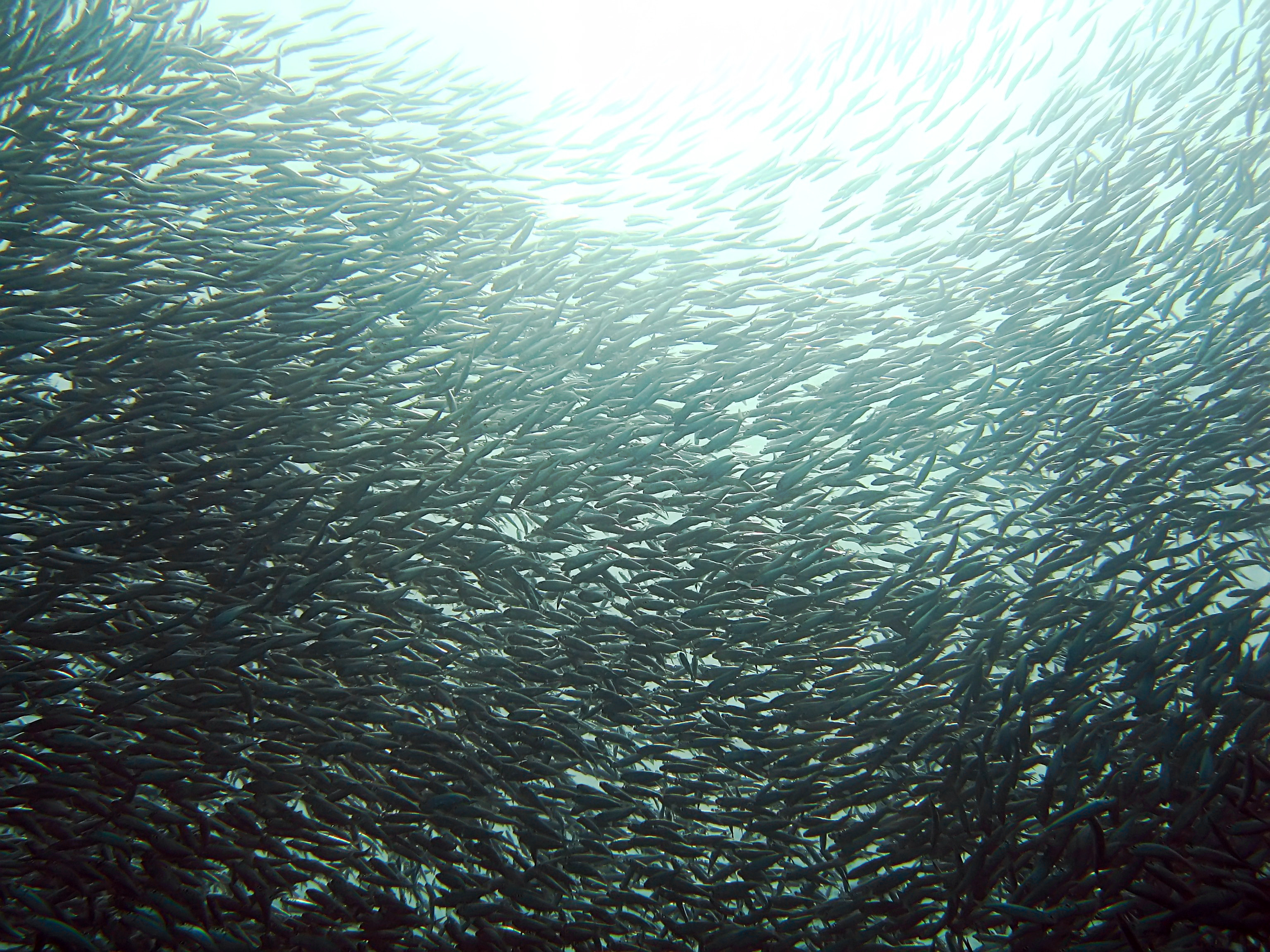
Sardines are small epipelagic fish that sometimes migrate along the coast in large schools. They are an important forage fish for larger forms of marine life.

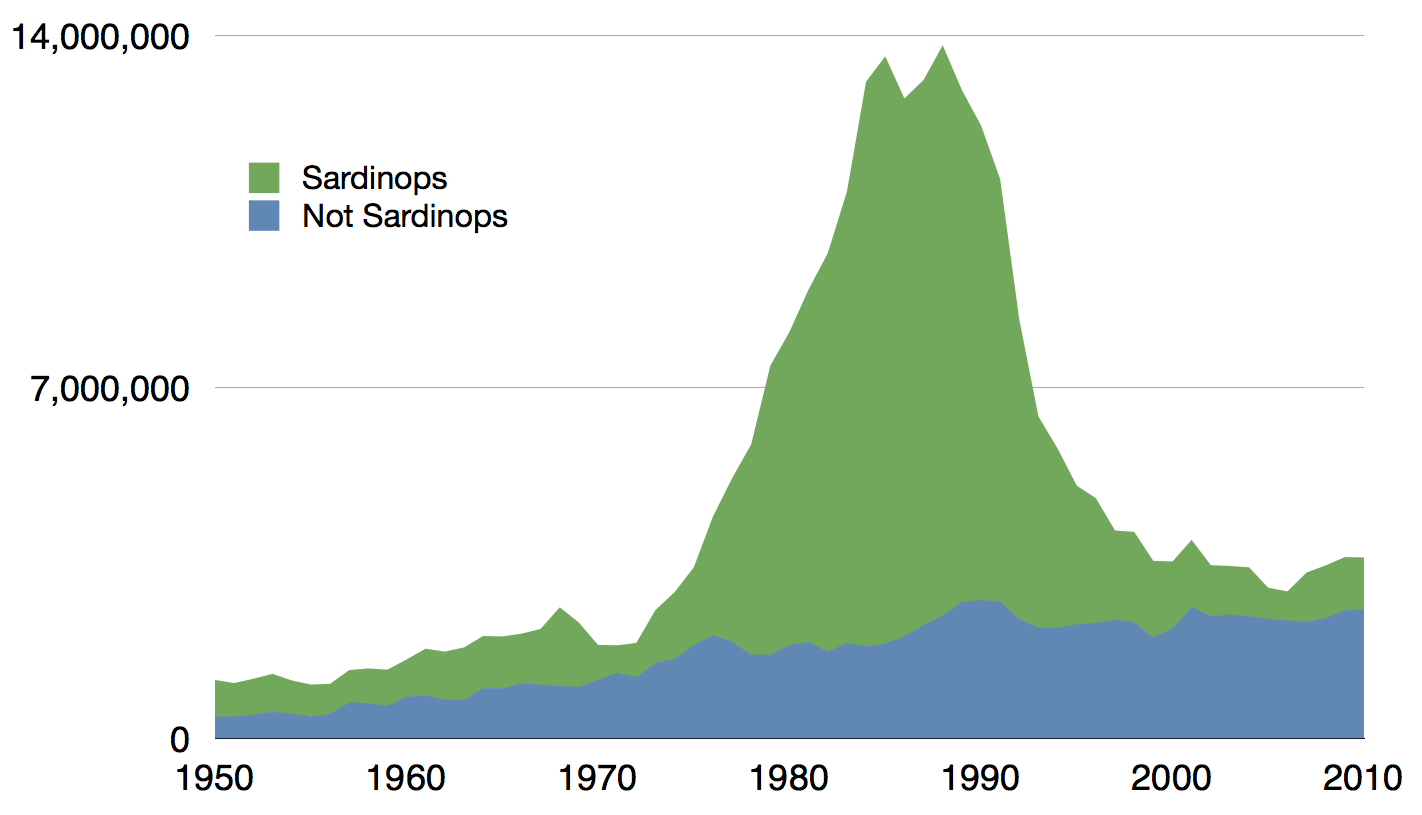
Global commercial capture of sardines in tonnes reported by the FAO 1950–2009

Sardine and pilchard are common names for various species of small, oily forage fish in the herring suborder Clupeoidei. The term "sardine" was first used in English during the early 15th century, possibly referring to Sardinia, around which sardines were once supposedly abundant.

The terms "sardine" and "pilchard" are not precise, and what is meant depends on the region. The United Kingdom's Sea Fish Industry Authority, for example, classifies sardines as young pilchards. One criterion suggests fish shorter in length than 15 cm (6 in) are sardines, and larger fish are pilchards. The FAO/WHO Codex standard for canned sardines cites 21 species that may be classed as sardines. FishBase, a database of information about fish, calls at least six species pilchards, over a dozen just sardines, and many more with the two basic names qualified by various adjectives.

== Etymology ==
The word sardine first appeared in English in the 15th century, a loanword from French sardine, derived from Latin sardina, from Ancient Greek σαρδίνη (sardínē) or σαρδῖνος (sardĩnos), possibly from the Greek Σαρδώ (Sardō) for Sardinia.

Athenaios quotes a fragmentary passage from Aristotle mentioning the fish σαρδῖνος (sardĩnos), referring to the sardine or pilchard. However, Sardinia is over 1000 km from Athens, so it seems "hardly probable that the Greeks would have obtained fish from so far as Sardinia at a time relatively so early as that of Aristotle", although the Myceneans traded with the Sardinians during the latter Bronze Age.

The flesh of some sardines or pilchards is a reddish-brown colour similar to some varieties of red sardonyx or sardine stone; this word derives from σαρδῖον (sardĩon) with a root meaning 'red' and possibly cognate with Sardis, the capital of ancient Lydia (now western Turkey) where it was obtained. However, the name may refer to the reddish-pink colour of the gemstone sard (or carnelian) known to the ancients.

== Genera ==
Sardines occur in several genera.

- Genus Dussumieria
  - Rainbow sardine (Dussumieria acuta)
  - Slender rainbow sardine (Dussumieria elopsoides)
- Genus Escualosa
  - Slender white sardine (Escualosa elongata)
  - White sardine (Escualosa thoracata)
- Genus Sardina
  - European pilchard (true sardine) (Sardina pilchardus)
- Genus Sardinella

25 species

- Genus Sardinops
  - Japanese pilchard (Sardinops melanosticta)
  - Southern African pilchard (Sardinops ocellatus)
  - South American pilchard (Sardinops sagax)

Although they are not true sardines, sprats are sometimes marketed as sardines. For example, the European sprat, Sprattus sprattus, is sometimes marketed as the 'brisling sardine'.

== Species ==
Commercially significant species
Genus	Common name	Scientific name	Max. length		Typ. length		Max. mass		Max. age years	Trophic level	Fish- Base	FAO	ITIS	IUCN status
Genus	Common name	Scientific name	cm	in	cm	in	g	oz	Max. age years	Trophic level	Fish- Base	FAO	ITIS	IUCN status
Sardina	European pilchard	Sardina pilchardus (Walbaum, 1792)	27.5	10.8	20.0	7.9			15	3.05				Least Concern
Sardinops	South American pilchard	Sardinops sagax (Jenyns, 1842)	39.5	15.6	20.0	7.9	490	17	25	2.43				Least Concern
Sardinops	Japanese pilchard (Note: There are four distinct stocks in the genus Sardinops, widely separated by geography. The FAO treats these stocks as separate species, while FishBase treats them as one species, Sardinops sagax.)	Sardinops melanostictus (Schlegel, 1846)												NE
Sardinops	Californian pilchard	Sardinops caeruleus (Girard, 1854)												NE
Sardinops	southern African pilchard	Sardinops ocellatus (Pappe, 1854)												NE
Sardinella	Bali sardinella	Sardinella lemuru (Bleeker, 1853)	23	9.1	20	7.9								Near Threatened
Sardinella	Brazilian sardinella	Sardinella brasiliensis (Steindachner, 1879)								3.10				Data Deficient
Sardinella	Japanese sardinella	Sardinella zunasi (Bleeker, 1854)								3.12				Least Concern
Sardinella	Indian oil sardine	Sardinella longiceps (Valenciennes, 1847)								2.41				Least Concern
Sardinella	Goldstripe sardinella	Sardinella gibbosa (Bleeker, 1849)								2.85				Least Concern
Sardinella	Round sardinella	Sardinella aurita (Valenciennes, 1847)								3.40				Least Concern
Sardinella	Madeiran sardinella	Sardinella maderensis (Lowe, 1839)								3.20				Vulnerable
Sardinella	Marquesan sardinella	Sardinella marquesensis (Berry & Whitehead, 1968)	16	6.3	10	3.9				2.90				Least Concern
Dussumieria	Rainbow sardine	Dussumieria acuta (Valenciennes, 1847)			20	7.9				3.40				Least Concern

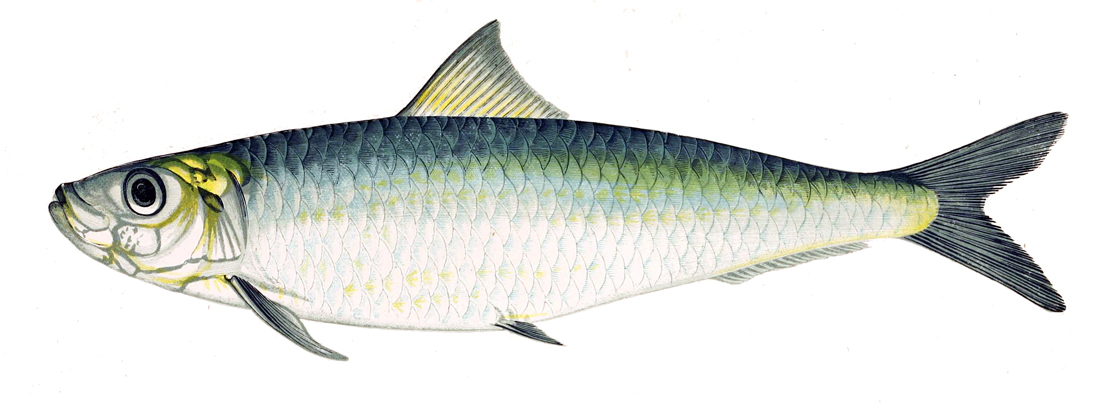
The European pilchard, Sardina pilchardus

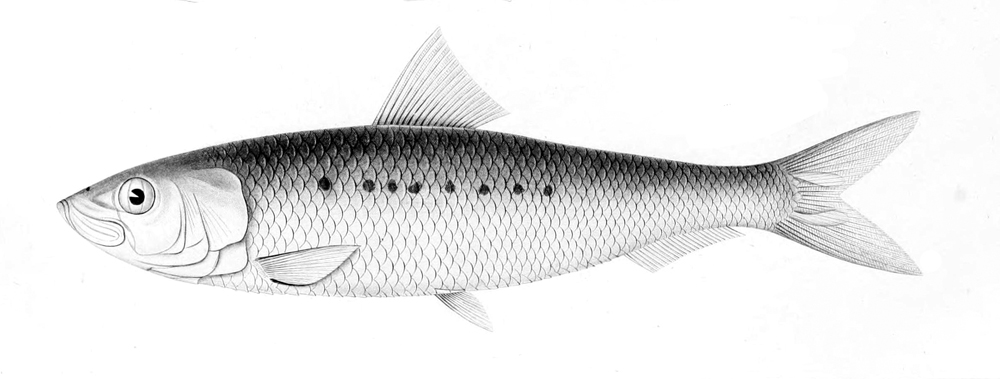
In the 1980s the South American pilchard, Sardinops sagax, was the most intensively fished species of sardine. Some major stocks declined precipitously in the 1990s (see chart below).

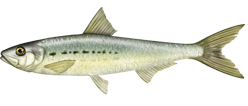
The Pacific sardine, Sardinops sagax caerulea

== Feeding ==
Sardines feed almost exclusively on zooplankton and congregate wherever this is abundant.

== Fisheries ==
Global capture of sardines in tonnes reported by the FAO

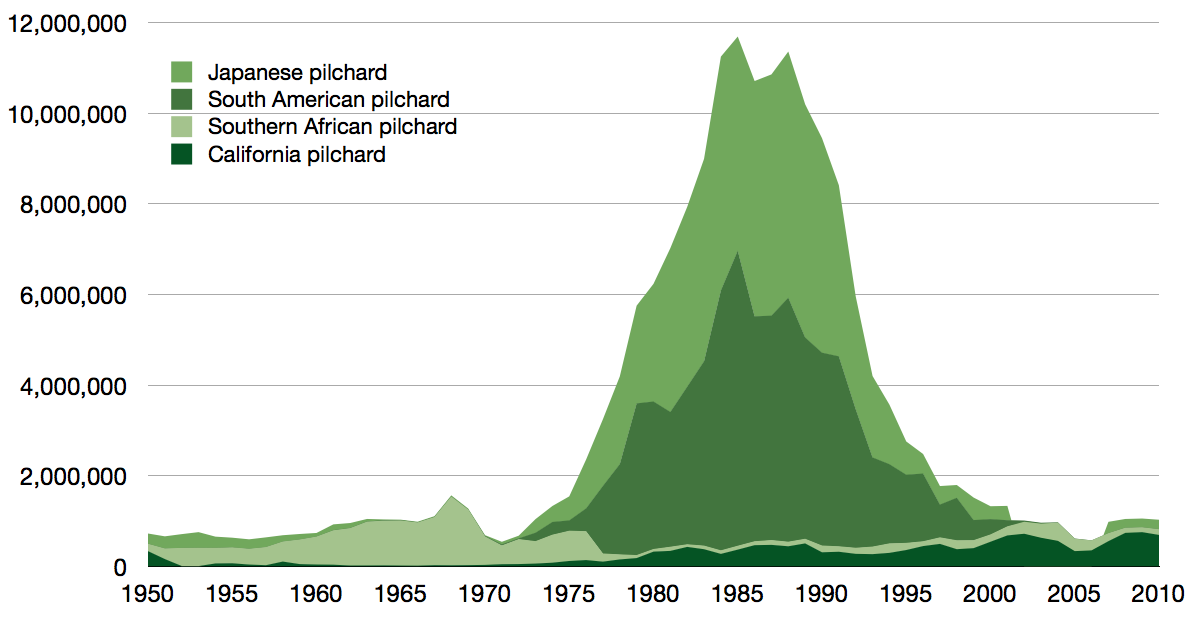
Sardines of the genus Sardinops, 1950–2010

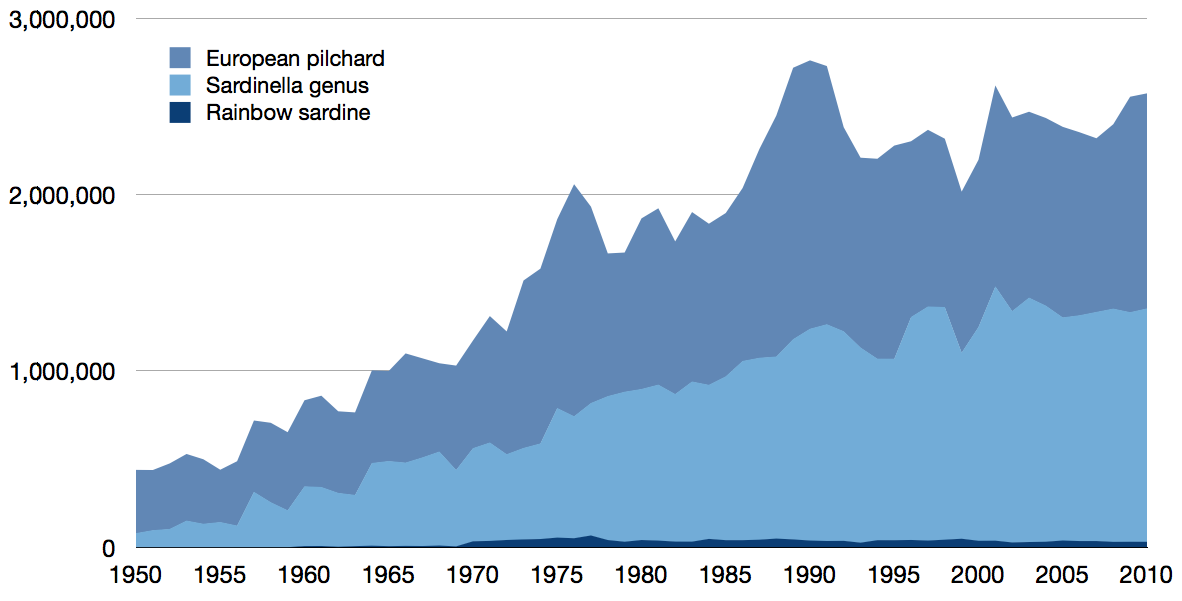
Sardines not of the genus Sardinops, 1950–2010

Typically, sardines are caught with encircling nets, particularly purse seines. Many modifications of encircling nets are used, including traps or fishing weirs. The latter are stationary enclosures composed of stakes into which schools of sardines are diverted as they swim along the coast. The fish are caught mainly at night, when they approach the surface to feed on plankton. After harvesting, the fish are submerged in brine while they are transported to shore.

== Usage ==
Sardines are commercially fished for a variety of uses: for bait; for immediate consumption; for drying, salting, or smoking; and for reduction into fish meal or oil. The chief use of sardines is for human consumption, but fish meal is used as animal feed, while sardine oil has many uses, including the manufacture of paint, varnish, and linoleum.

=== Food and nutrition ===
Pacific sardines canned in tomato sauce, drained solids with bone
Nutritional value per 100 g (3.5 oz)
- Energy: 774 kJ (185 kcal)
- Carbohydrates: 0.54 g
- Fat: 10.4 g
- Protein: 20.9 g
Vitamins and minerals
Vitamins	Quantity %DV^{†}
Thiamine (B1)	4% 0.044 mg
Riboflavin (B2)	18% 0.233 mg
Niacin (B3)	26% 4.2 mg
Pantothenic acid (B5)	15% 0.73 mg
Vitamin B6	7% 0.123 mg
Folate (B9)	6% 24 μg
Vitamin B12	375% 9 μg
Minerals	Quantity %DV^{†}
Calcium	18% 240 mg
Iron	13% 2.3 mg
Magnesium	8% 34 mg
Manganese	9% 0.206 mg
Phosphorus	29% 366 mg
Potassium	11% 341 mg
Sodium	18% 414 mg
Zinc	13% 1.4 mg
- Other constituents: Quantity
- Water: 66.9 g
- Link to USDA Database entry
- ^{†}Percentages estimated using US recommendations for adults, except for potassium, which is estimated based on expert recommendation from the National Academies.

Sardines are commonly consumed by humans as a source of protein, omega-3 fatty acids, and micronutrients. Sardines may be grilled, pickled, smoked, or preserved in cans.

Canned sardines are 67% water, 21% protein, 10% fat, and contain negligible carbohydrates (table). In a reference amount of 100 g (3.5 oz), canned sardines supply 185 calories of food energy and are a rich source (20% or more of the Daily Value, DV) of vitamin B12 (375% DV), phosphorus (29% DV), and niacin (26% DV) (table). Sardines are a moderate source (10–19% DV) of the B vitamins, riboflavin and pantothenic acid, and several dietary minerals, including calcium and sodium (18% DV each) (table). A 100 g serving of canned sardines supplies about 7 g combined of monounsaturated and polyunsaturated fatty acids (USDA source in table).

Because they are low in the food chain, sardines are low in contaminants, such as mercury, relative to other fish commonly eaten by humans, and have a relatively low impact in production of greenhouse gases.

=== Non-food usage ===
Imperial Japan and Nazi Germany used hydrogenated sardine oil chemically converted into nitroglycerin to produce explosive weapons.

As of 2020, in Japan around 70% of sardines were used for nonedible purposes, such as oil, fertilizer, and fish feed.

== History ==
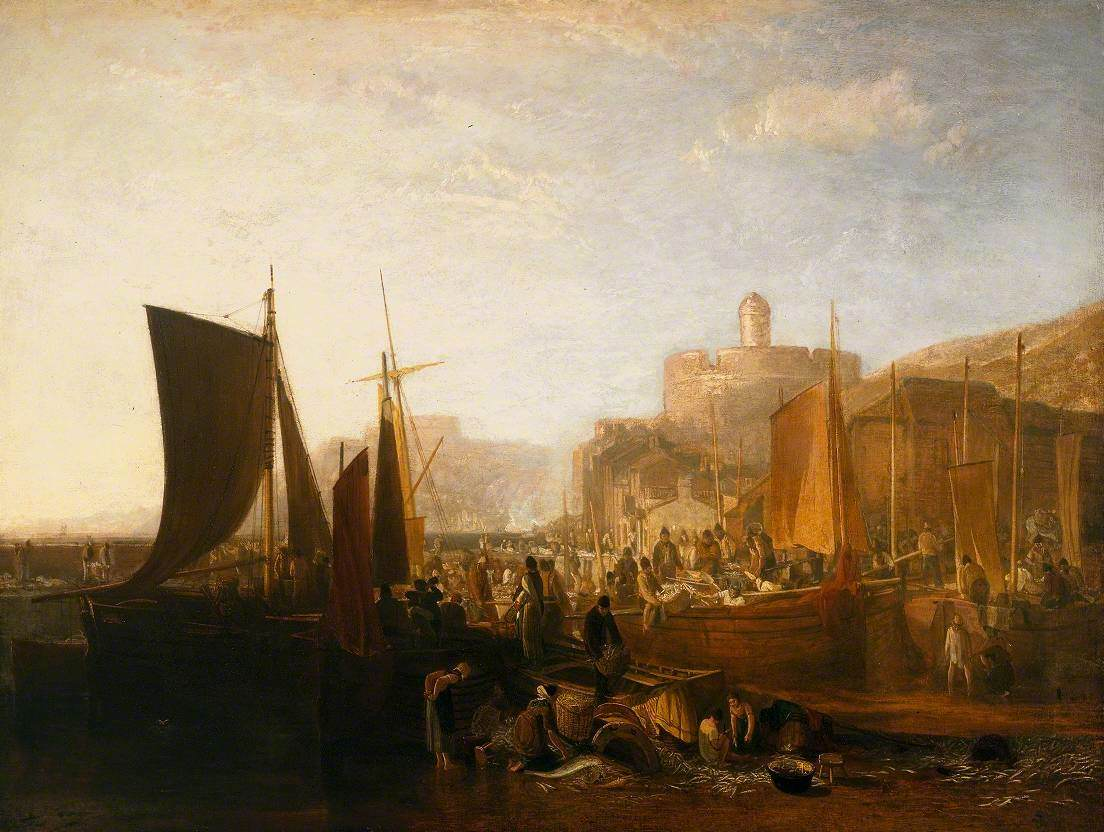
St Mawes at the Pilchard Season by J.M.W. Turner, 1812

=== History of sardine fishing in the UK ===
Pilchard fishing and processing became a thriving industry in Cornwall, England from around 1750 to around 1880, after which it went into decline. Catches varied from year to year, and in 1871, the catch was 47,000 hogsheads, while in 1877, only 9,477 hogsheads. A hogshead contained 2,300 to 4,000 pilchards, and when filled with pressed pilchards, weighed 476 lbs. The pilchards were mostly exported to Roman Catholic countries such as Italy and Spain, where they are known as fermades. The chief market for the oil was Bristol, where it was used on machinery.

Since 1997, sardines from Cornwall have been sold as 'Cornish sardines', and since March 2010, under EU law, Cornish sardines have Protected Geographical Status. The industry has featured in numerous works of art, particularly by Stanhope Forbes and other Newlyn School artists.

The traditional "Toast to Pilchards" refers to the lucrative export of the fish to Catholic Europe:

Here's health to the Pope, may he live to repent
And add just six months to the term of his Lent
And tell all his vassals from Rome to the Poles,
There's nothing like pilchards for saving their souls!

=== History of sardine fishing in the United States ===
In the United States, the sardine canning industry peaked in the 1950s. Since then, the industry has been on the decline. The canneries in Monterey Bay, in what was known as Cannery Row in Monterey County, California (where John Steinbeck's novel of the same name was set), failed in the mid-1950s. The last large sardine cannery in the United States, the Stinson Seafood plant in Prospect Harbor, Maine, closed its doors on 15 April 2010 after 135 years in operation.

In April 2015 the Pacific Fishery Management Council voted to direct NOAA Fisheries Service to halt the current commercial season in Oregon, Washington and California, because of a dramatic collapse in Pacific sardine stocks. The ban affected about 100 fishing boats with sardine permits, although far fewer were actively fishing at the time. The season normally would end 30 June. The ban was expected to last for more than a year, and was still in place as of August 2025.

== In popular culture ==
The manner in which sardines can be packed in a can has led to the popular English language saying "packed like sardines", which is used metaphorically to describe situations where people or objects are crowded closely together. The phrase "packed up like sardines" appears in The Mirror of Literature, Amusement, and Instruction from 1841, and is a translation of "encaissés comme des sardines", which appears in La Femme, le mari, et l'amant from 1829. Other early appearances of the idiom are "packed together ... like sardines in a tin-box" (1845), and "packed ... like sardines in a can" (1854).

"Sardines" is also the name of a children's game, where one person hides and each successive person who finds the hidden one packs into the same space until only one is left out, who becomes the next one to hide.

Among the residents of the Mediterranean city of Marseille, the local tendency to exaggerate is linked to a folk tale about a sardine that supposedly blocked the city's port in the 18th century. It was actually blocked by a ship called the Sartine.

== Gallery ==
Sardines use body-caudal fin locomotion to swim, and streamline their bodies by holding their other fins flat against the body

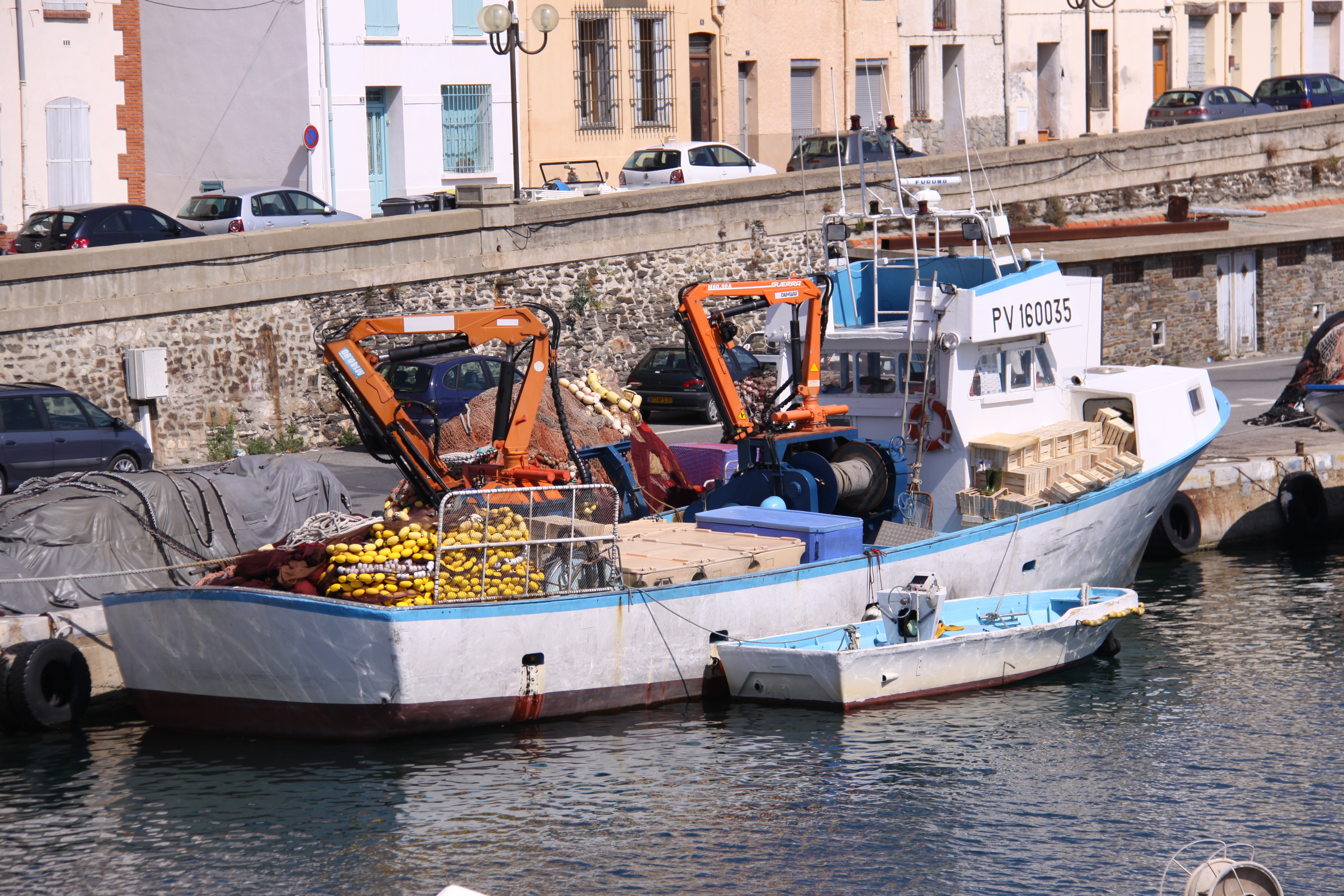
French sardine seiner

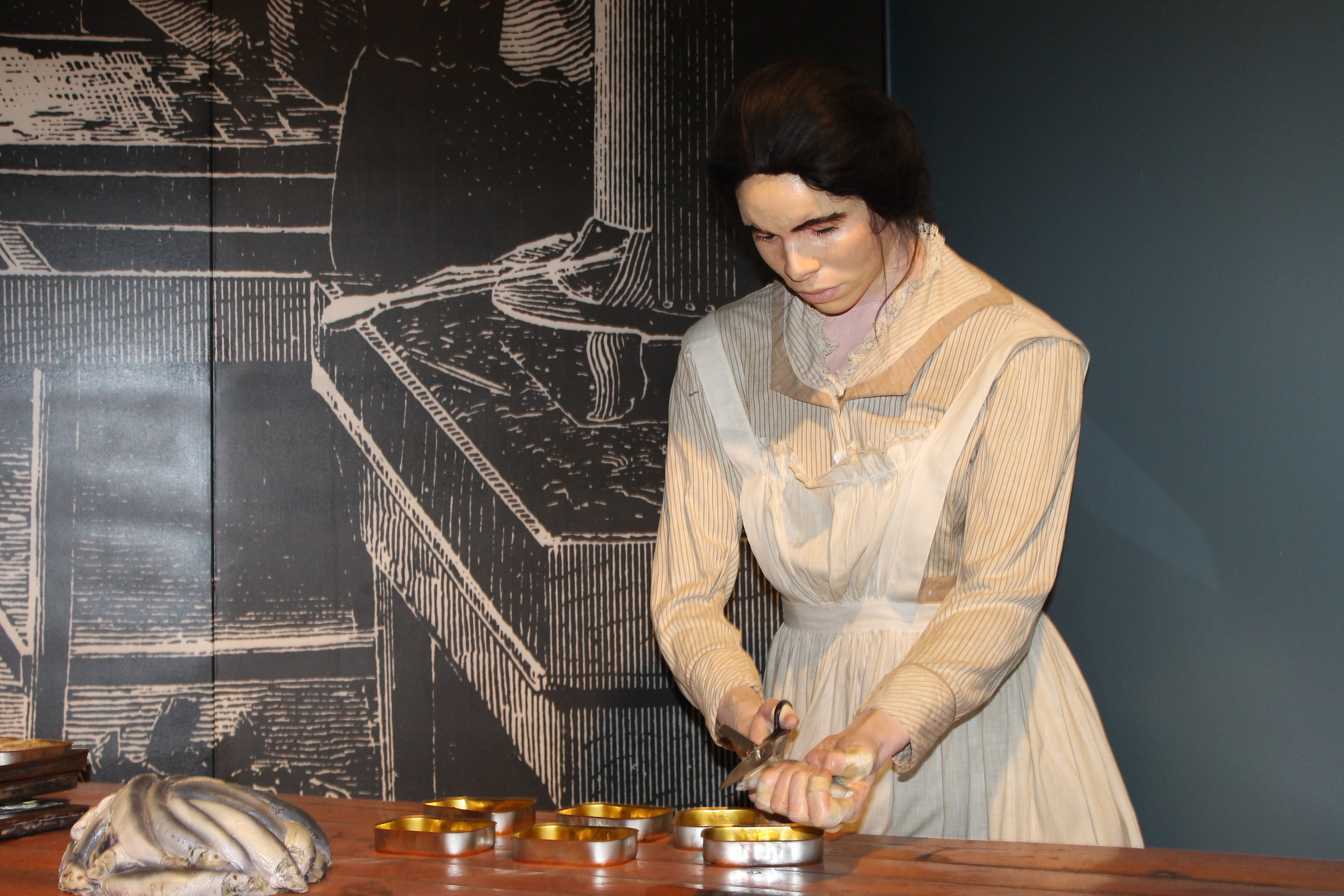
Exhibit of a woman canning sardines at the Maine State Museum in Augusta

== See also ==
- Chasse-marée
- Sardine run
