= List of commercially important fish species =

Aquatic animals that are harvested commercially in the greatest amounts

World capture fisheries and aquaculture production by species group

This is a list of aquatic animals that are harvested commercially in the greatest amounts, listed in order of tonnage per year (2012) by the Food and Agriculture Organization. Species listed here have an annual tonnage in excess of 160,000 tonnes.

This table includes mainly food fish species, but also listed are crustaceans (crabs and shrimps), cephalopods (squids and cuttlefishs), bivalves, and a reptile (softshell turtle).

Note that Oreochromis niloticus and Penaeus monodon appear twice, because substantial amounts are harvested from the wild as well as being extensively raised through aquaculture.

== Summary ==
The 70 wild species shown in this table total 41,925,250 tonnes. Other wild species total 49,410,980 for a world total of 91,336,230 tonnes of wild, captured animals.

The 31 cultivated species shown in this table total 45,252,999 tonnes. Other cultivated species total 21,380,254 tonnes for a world total of 66,633,253 tonnes of animals cultivated through aquaculture.

== Harvested aquatic animals by weight ==
Common name(s)	Binomial name	Image	Wild/ cultivated	Harvest in tonnes	Notes
Grass carp	Ctenopharyngodon idella		Cultivated	6,068,014	China is the major producer of the grass carp, which grows quickly and requires fairly little dietary protein. Low-cost feed such as grain processing and vegetable oil extraction by-products, terrestrial grass, and aquatic weeds, allows the grass carp to be produced cheaply. This fish is mainly sold fresh, either in pieces or whole.
Peruvian anchoveta	Engraulis ringens		Wild	4,692,855	
Silver carp	Hypophthalmichthys molitrix		Cultivated	4,189,578	A variety of Asian carp, widely cultivated with other aquaculture carp, but under pressure in its home range (China and eastern Siberia). Also called "flying fish", it is an invasive species in many countries.
Common carp	Cyprinus carpio		Cultivated	3,791,913	
Asari, Japanese littleneck, Manila clam, Filipino Venus, Japanese cockle, Japanese carpet shell	Venerupis philippinarum		Cultivated	3,785,311	
Alaska pollock	Theragra chalcogramma		Wild	3,271,426	This species is often the main ingredient in the so-called crab sticks.
Nile tilapia	Oreochromis niloticus		Cultivated	3,197,330	
Whiteleg shrimp	Penaeus vannamei		Cultivated	3,178,721	
Bighead carp	Hypophthalmichthys nobilis		Cultivated	2,898,816	
Skipjack tuna	Katsuwonus pelamis		Wild	2,795,339	
Catla	Catla catla		Cultivated	2,761,022	
Crucian carp	Carassius carassius		Cultivated	2,451,845	
Atlantic salmon	Salmo salar		Cultivated	2,066,561	The wild Atlantic salmon fishery is commercially dead; after extensive habitat damage and overfishing, wild fish make up only 0.5% of the Atlantic salmon available in world fish markets. The rest are farmed, predominantly from aquaculture in Norway, Chile, Canada, the UK, Ireland, Faroe Islands, Russia and Tasmania in Australia.
Atlantic herring	Clupea harengus		Wild	1,849,969	
Chub mackerel	Scomber japonicus		Wild	1,581,314	
Rohu	Labeo rohita		Cultivated	1,555,546	
Yellowfin tuna	Thunnus albacares		Wild	1,352,204	
Japanese anchovy	Engraulis japonicus		Wild	1,296,383	
Largehead hairtail	Trichiurus lepturus		Wild	1,235,373	
Atlantic Cod	Gadus morhua		Wild	1,114,382	
European pilchard	Sardina pilchardus		Wild	1,019,392	
Capelin	Mallotus villosus		Wild	1,006,533	
Jumbo flying squid	Dosidicus gigas		Wild	950,630	
Milkfish	Chanos chanos		Cultivated	943,259	
Atlantic mackerel	Scomber scombrus		Wild	910,697	
Rainbow trout	Oncorhynchus mykiss		Cultivated	855,982	
Giant tiger prawn Asian tiger shrimp	Penaeus monodon		Cultivated	855,055	
Araucanian herring	Clupea bentincki		Wild	848,466	
Chinese razor clam Agemaki clam	Sinonovacula constricta		Cultivated	720,466	
Chinese mitten crab	Eriocheir sinensis		Cultivated	714,392	
Wuchang bream	Megalobrama amblycephala		Cultivated	705,821	
Pacific oyster Japanese oyster Miyagi oyster	Crassostrea gigas		Cultivated	608,688	
Louisiana crawfish Red swamp crawfish	Procambarus clarkii		Cultivated	598,289	
Akiami paste shrimp	Acetes japonicus		Wild	588,761	One of 14 species in the genus Acetes, this small, krill-like prawn is used to produce shrimp paste in South East Asia.
Gulf menhaden	Brevoortia patronus		Wild	578,693	
Indian oil sardine	Sardinella longiceps		Wild	560,145	
Black carp	Mylopharyngodon piceus		Cultivated	495,074	
European anchovy	Engraulis encrasicolus		Wild	489,297	
Northern snakehead	Channa argus		Cultivated	480,854	
Pacific cod	Gadus macrocephalus		Wild	474,047	
Pacific saury	Cololabis saira		Wild	460,961	
Pacific herring	Clupea pallasii		Wild	451,457	
Bigeye tuna	Thunnus obesus		Wild	450,546	
Chilean jack mackerel	Trachurus murphyi		Wild	447,060	
Yellow croaker	Larimichthys polyactis		Wild	437,613	
Haddock	Melanogrammus aeglefinus		Wild	430,917	
Gazami crab	Portunus trituberculatus		Wild	429,959	
Amur catfish Japanese common catfish	Silurus asotus		Cultivated	413,350	
European sprat	Sprattus sprattus		Wild	408,509	
Pink salmon	Oncorhynchus gorbuscha		Wild	406,131	
Mrigal carp	Cirrhinus mrigala		Cultivated	396,476	
Channel catfish	Ictalurus punctatus		Cultivated	394,179	See also: Aquaculture of catfish
Blood cockle	Anadara granosa		Cultivated	391,574	
Blue whiting	Micromesistius poutassou		Wild	378,794	
Hilsa shad	Tenualosa ilisha		Wild	376,734	
Daggertooth pike conger	Muraenesox cinereus		Wild	372,704	
California pilchard	Sardinops caeruleus		Wild	364,386	
Cape horse mackerel	Trachurus capensis		Wild	356,795	
Pacific anchoveta	Cetengraulis mysticetus		Wild	352,945	
Japanese flying squid	Todarodes pacificus		Wild	351,229	
Argentine shortfin squid	Illex argentinus		Wild	340,622	
Pollock	Pollachius virens		Wild	336,838	
Chinese softshell turtle	Pelodiscus sinensis		Cultivated	335,535	This species is a significant part of China's aquaculture. According to the data obtained from 684 Chinese turtle farms, they sold over 91 million turtles of this species every year; considering that these farms represented less than half of the 1,499 registered turtle farms in China, the nationwide total could be over twice as high.
Kawakawa	Euthynnus affinis		Wild	328,927	
Indian mackerel	Rastrelliger kanagurta		Wild	325,612	
Asian swamp eel	Monopterus albus		Cultivated	321,006	
Yesso scallop	Patinopecten yessoensis		Wild	318,081	
Argentine hake	Merluccius hubbsi		Wild	318,067	
Northern prawn	Pandalus borealis		Wild	315,511	
Short mackerel	Rastrelliger brachysoma		Wild	312,930	
Southern rough shrimp	Trachysalambria curvirostris		Wild	308,257	
Southern African anchovy	Engraulis capensis		Wild	307,606	
Pond loach	Misgurnus anguillicaudatus		Cultivated	294,456	
Iridescent shark	Pangasius hypophthalmus		Cultivated	285,089	
Mandarin fish Chinese perch	Siniperca chuatsi		Cultivated	281,502	
Nile perch	Lates niloticus		Wild	278,675	
Round sardinella	Sardinella aurita		Wild	273,018	
Japanese pilchard	Sardinops melanostictus		Wild	269,972	
American sea scallop	Placopecten magellanicus		Wild	267,745	
Bombay-duck	Harpadon nehereus		Wild	257,376	
Yellowhead catfish Korean bullhead	Tachysurus fulvidraco		Cultivated	256,650	
Narrow-barred Spanish mackerel	Scomberomorus commerson		Wild	256,469	
Albacore	Thunnus alalunga		Wild	256,082	
Madeiran sardinella	Sardinella maderensis		Wild	251,342	
Bonga shad	Ethmalosa fimbriata		Wild	249,422	
Silver cyprinid	Rastrineobola argentea		Wild	241,122	
Nile tilapia	Oreochromis niloticus		Wild	235,003	
Longtail tuna	Thunnus tonggol		Wild	234,427	
Atlantic menhaden	Brevoortia tyrannus		Wild	224,404	
Giant tiger prawn	Penaeus monodon		Wild	212,504	
North Pacific hake	Merluccius productus		Wild	206,985	
Atlantic horse mackerel	Trachurus trachurus		Wild	205,807	
Japanese jack mackerel	Trachurus japonicus		Wild	202,816	
Pacific thread herring	Opisthonema libertate		Wild	201,993	One of five species in the genus Opisthonema
Bigeye scad	Selar crumenophthalmus		Wild	200,617	
Yellowstripe scad	Selaroides leptolepis		Wild	198,600	
Chum salmon	Oncorhynchus keta		Wild	189,777	
Antarctic krill	Euphausia superba		Wild	188,147	
Blue swimming crab	Portunus pelagicus		Wild	180,119	
Pacific sand lance Pacific sandlance	Ammodytes personatus		Wild	175,892	Mostly manufactured into oil and meal, but also used as food in Japan.
Goldstripe sardinella	Sardinella gibbosa		Wild	161,839	

== See also ==
- Aquatic animal – Animal living mostly or entirely in water
- Freshwater fish – Fish that mostly live in freshwater
- Marine biology – Scientific study of ocean life
- Saltwater fish – Fish that live all or much of their lives in seawater
- World fish production
- Fishing industry by country
- Seafood#Types of seafood
  - List of types of seafood
