= John Richardson (naturalist) =

Scottish naval surgeon, naturalist and arctic explorer (1787–1865)

Sir John Richardson FRS FRSE
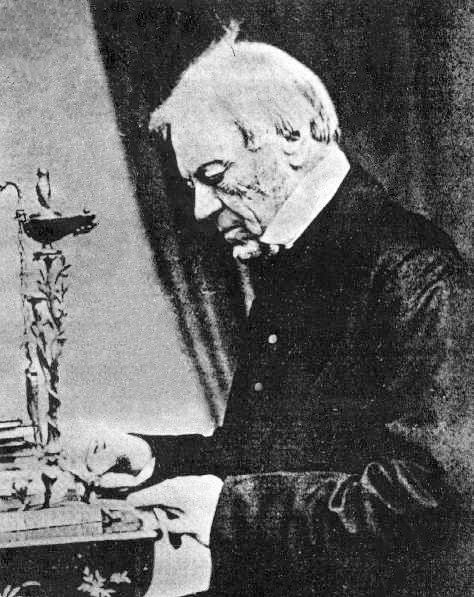
- Born: 5 November 1787; Dumfries, Scotland
- Died: 5 June 1865 (aged 77); Lake District
- Education: Edinburgh University
- Awards: Royal Medal (1856)
- Scientific career
- Fields: Surgeon; Naturalist
- Author abbrev. (botany): Richardson

Sir John Richardson FRS FRSE (5 November 1787 – 5 June 1865) was a Scottish naval surgeon, naturalist and Arctic explorer.

== Life ==
Richardson was born at Nith Place in Dumfries the son of Gabriel Richardson, Provost of Dumfries, and his wife, Anne Mundell. He was educated at Dumfries Grammar School. He was then apprenticed to his maternal uncle, Dr James Mundell, a surgeon in Dumfries.

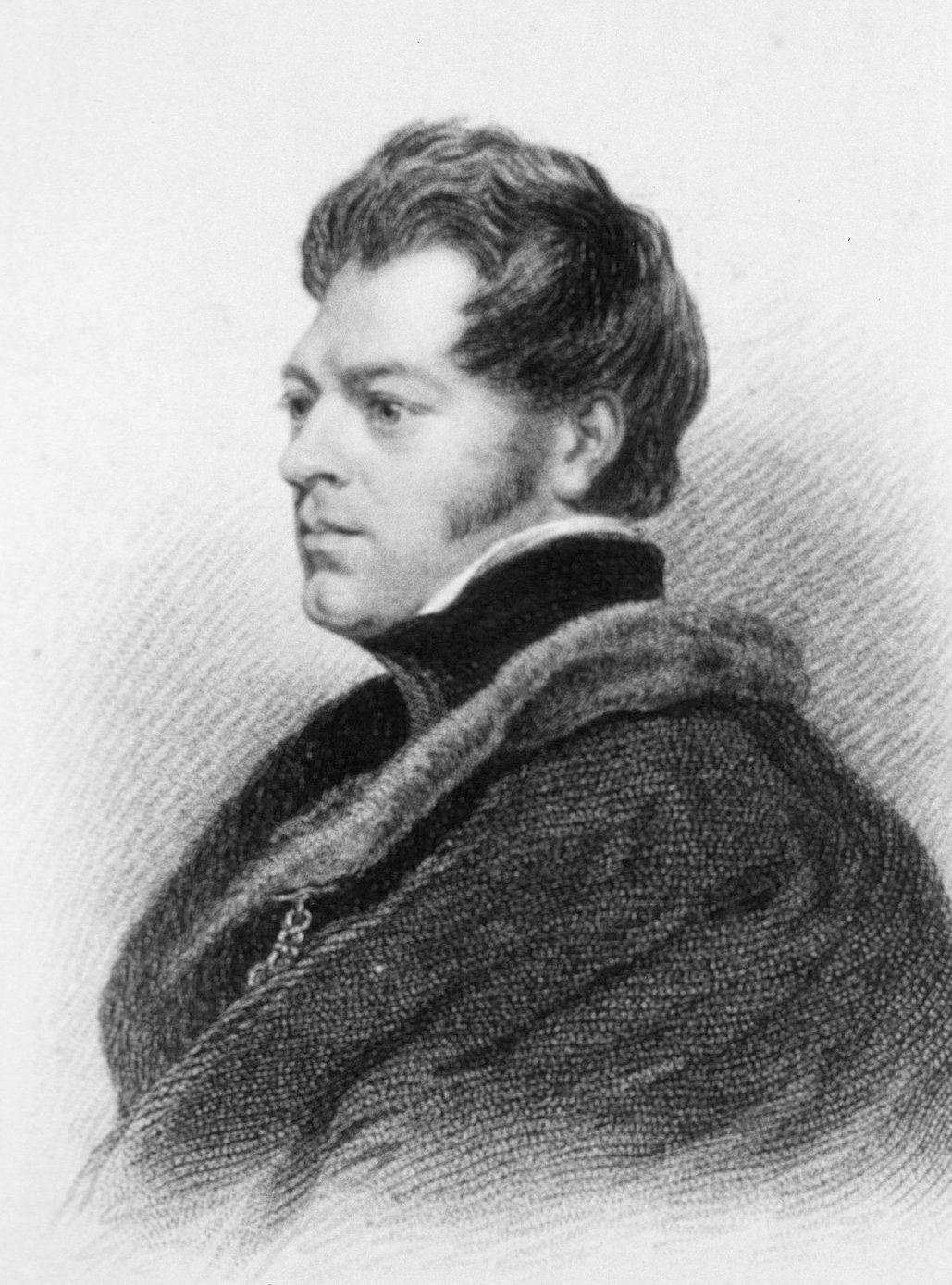
John Richardson, 1828 by Thomas Phillips, R.A., engraved by Edward Finden

Richardson studied medicine at Edinburgh University, and became a surgeon in the navy in 1807. He traveled with John Franklin in search of the Northwest Passage on the Coppermine Expedition of 1819–1822. Richardson wrote the sections on geology, botany and ichthyology for the official account of the expedition.

Franklin and Richardson returned to Canada in 1825 and went overland by fur trade routes to the mouth of the Mackenzie River. Franklin was to go as far west as possible and Richardson was to go east to the mouth of the Coppermine River. These were the only known points on the central coast and had been reached in 1793 and 1771 respectively. He had with him two specially-built boats which were more ocean-worthy than the voyageur canoes used by Franklin on his previous expedition. They gave their names to the Dolphin and Union Strait near the end of his route.

Richardson's journey was successful and he reached his furthest east the same day that Franklin reached his furthest west (16 August 1826). He abandoned his boats at Bloody Falls and trekked overland to Fort Franklin which he reached three weeks before Franklin. Together they had surveyed 1,878 mi (3,022 km) of previously unmapped coast. The natural history discoveries of this expedition were so great that they had to be recorded in two separate works, the Flora Boreali-Americana (1833–40), written by William Jackson Hooker, and the Fauna Boreali-Americana (1829–37), written by Richardson, William Swainson, John Edward Gray and William Kirby.

At the British Association for the Advancement of Science meeting in 1842, Richardson described the diving apparatus and treatment of diver Roderick Cameron following an injury that occurred on 14 October 1841 during the salvage operations on HMS Royal George.

Richardson was knighted by Queen Victoria in 1846. He traveled with John Rae on an unsuccessful search for Franklin in 1848–49, describing it in An Arctic Searching Expedition (1851).

Richardson retired to the Lake District in 1855. While there, Richardson (helped by his daughter Beatrice) sent words for inclusion in the Oxford English Dictionary. This was in response to a public appeal by editor James Murray for volunteers to contribute words; several thousand were recruited. Richardson's contribution totalled 23,568. The stories of many such volunteers are told by Sarah Ogilvie in her book The Dictionary People.

Richardson died at his home Lancrigg House north of Grasmere on 5 June 1865, and is buried at St Oswald's Church, Grasmere.

== Family ==
Richardson married three times: firstly in 1818 to Mary Stiven; secondly in 1833 to Mary Booth; and finally in 1847 to Mary Fletcher.

== Works ==
Richardson also wrote accounts dealing with the natural history, and especially the ichthyology, of several other Arctic voyages, and was the author of Icones Piscium (1843), Catalogue of Apodal Fish in the British Museum (1856), the second edition of Yarrell's History of British Fishes (1860), The Polar Regions (1861). and Arctic Ordeal: The Journal of John Richardson Edited by C. Stuart Houston (1984). The National Marine Biological Library at the Marine Biological Association retains some original illustrations used by Richardson in preparation for the second edition of Yarrell's book.

== Taxa named in his honor ==
=== Reptiles ===
Richardson is commemorated in the scientific names of four species of reptiles:

- Eremiascincus richardsonii
- Hemidactylus richardsonii
- Myron richardsonii
- Sphaerodactylus richardsonii

=== Mammals ===
The mammal species

- The American ermine, Mustela richardsonii,
- The ground squirrel, Urocitellus richardsonii, and
- The collared lemming, Dicrostonyx richardsoni are also named for him.

=== Plants ===
- Boykinia richardsonii, commonly known as Richardson's brookfoam, less commonly as Richardson's boykinia or Richardson's saxifrage.
- Heuchera richardsonii, commonly known as prairie alumroot or Richardson's alumroot

=== Fish ===
- Diaphus richardsoni Tåning, 1932, is a species of lanternfish found worldwide.
- Sardinella richardsoni (Richardson's sardinella) is a species of ray-finned fish in the genus Sardinella from the South China Sea in the northwest Pacific.
- Astronesthes richardsoni, or Richardson's snaggletooth, is a species of small, deep sea fish in the family Stomiidae. It occurs in the tropical western Atlantic Ocean, the Caribbean Sea and the Gulf of Mexico.

== Taxon described by him ==
- See Category:Taxa named by John Richardson (naturalist)
