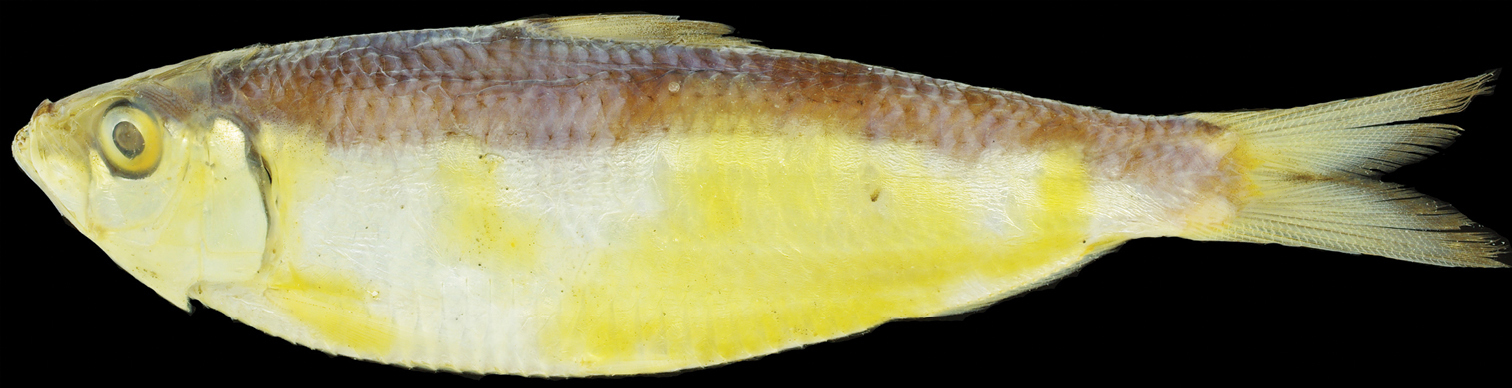
- Sample of the fish

Conservation status
- Data Deficient (IUCN 3.1)

Scientific classification
- Kingdom: Animalia
- Phylum: Chordata
- Class: Actinopterygii
- Division: Teleostei
- Order: Clupeiformes
- Family: Dorosomatidae
- Genus: Sardinella
- Species: S. pacifica

Binomial name
- Sardinella pacifica Hata & Motumura, 2019)

= Sardinella pacifica =

Species of fish

Sardinella pacifica is a species of marine fish belonging to the family Dorosomatidae, the thread herrings or gizzard shads and sardinella. This species is endemic to the waters around the Philippines.

== Taxonomy ==
Sardinella pacifica was first formally described in 2019 by the Japanese ichthyologists Harutaka Hata and Hiroyuki Motomura with its type locality given as Manila Harbor, Manila Bay, Luzon Island in the Philippines. The genus Sardinella is classified in the family Dorosomatidae, a tropical family of clupeiform fishes, which includes the thread herrings or gizzard shads and related species.

== Etymology ==
Sardinella pacifica belongs to the genus Sardinella, a diminutive of sardina, a reference to the similarity of these fishes to sardines. The specific name, pacifica means "belonging to the Pacific Ocean", this differentiates this species from S. fimbriata, which is now considered to be only found in the Indian Ocean.

== Description ==
Sardinella pacifica characterized with centrally discontinuous striae in its lateral scales, dorsal fin origin with a dark spot, lower gill rakers which is more than 70 on the first gill arch, eight rays of the pelvic fin, and 17-18 prepelvic and 12-13 postpelvic scutes, all of which it closely resembled that of Sardinella fimbriata. However, the two species differs in that, S. pacifica have lower count of lateral scales (38-41 compared to S. fimbriata, 44–46), lower count of pseudobranchial filaments(14-19 compared to S. fimbriata, 19–22), postpelvic scutes(12-13 compared to S. fimbriata, 13–14), and shorter lower jaw(10.4–11.6% of standard length compared to that of S. fimbriata which is 11.1–12.2% of standard length). The fish's gill rakers was considered as the species adaptation to Philippine waters.

== Distribution and habitat ==
Sardinella pacifica is currently known in the Philippines, particularly in Quezon, Sorsogon, Samar, and the Manila Bay.
