= Sardinella sindensis =

Sind sardinella

Scientific classification
- Kingdom: Animalia
- Phylum: Chordata
- Class: Actinopterygii
- Order: Clupeiformes
- Family: Dorosomatidae
- Genus: Sardinella
- Species: S. sindensis

Binomial name
- Sardinella sindensis (F. Day, 1878)

Species of fish

The Sind sardinella (Sardinella sindensis), often referred to as sardines, is a species of ray-finned schooling fish in the genus Sardinella.

They are found in the western Indian Ocean and the Arabian Sea, especially near Pakistan.
