= Sardinella hualiensis =

Taiwan sardinella

Scientific classification
- Domain: Eukaryota
- Kingdom: Animalia
- Phylum: Chordata
- Class: Actinopterygii
- Order: Clupeiformes
- Family: Dorosomatidae
- Genus: Sardinella
- Species: S. hualiensis

Binomial name
- Sardinella hualiensis (K. Y. Chu & C. F. Tsai, 1958)

Species of fish

Sardinella hualiensis (Taiwan sardinella) is a species of ray-finned fish in the genus Sardinella.

== Footnotes ==
- Froese, Rainer; Pauly, Daniel (eds.). "Sardinella hualiensis". FishBase.
