= Sardinella brasiliensis =

Brazilian sardinella

Conservation status
- Data Deficient (IUCN 3.1)

Scientific classification
- Domain: Eukaryota
- Kingdom: Animalia
- Phylum: Chordata
- Class: Actinopterygii
- Order: Clupeiformes
- Family: Dorosomatidae
- Genus: Sardinella
- Species: S. brasiliensis

Binomial name
- Sardinella brasiliensis (Steindachner, 1879)

Synonyms
- Sardinella janeiro (C. H. Eigenmann, 1894)

Species of fish

Sardinella brasiliensis, (Brazilian sardinella or orangespot sardine) is a species of ray-finned fish in the genus Sardinella. S. brasilensis are extremely hard to distinguish from Sardinella aurita and are combined in most studies and catch estimates. They spawn in coastal areas during late spring and summer. The most dense spawning periods are in December and January. From 1973 to 1990 the catch in Venezuela was down from 228000 tons to 31000 tons. These fish are present in the Western Atlantic (including the Gulf of Mexico, Caribbean, West Indies all the way down to Brazil

== Distinguishing features ==
The standard length of these sardinella is around 20 cm. S. brasiliensis is similar to their close relative S. aurita but S. brasiliensis have two peak spawning seasons. It is important to differentiate this species from S. aurita. Some of the features that make them unique include the anterior gillrakers (see List of ichthyology terms) which are curled down on the lower limbs of the second and third gill arches. They both have 8 rays on the pelvic fin and have 2 fleshy appendages along the outer margin of the gill opening with many scale stripes (striae) on the top of the head.

== Monitoring corruption in retail ==
It is common for retailers to substitute Sardinella brasilensis and closely related species for anchovies in commercial markets. In order to combat this false advertising scientists are developing an efficient method of testing mitochondrial DNA of these fish using the Polymerase Chain Reaction. The inaccurate representation of packaged fish is a potential safety hazard to consumers.
