= Sardinella richardsoni =

Richardson's sardinella

Scientific classification
- Domain: Eukaryota
- Kingdom: Animalia
- Phylum: Chordata
- Class: Actinopterygii
- Order: Clupeiformes
- Family: Dorosomatidae
- Genus: Sardinella
- Species: S. richardsoni

Binomial name
- Sardinella richardsoni Wongratana, 1983

Species of fish

Sardinella richardsoni (Richardson's sardinella) is a species of ray-finned fish in the genus Sardinella from the South China Sea in the northwest Pacific.

== Size ==
This species reaches a length of 12.0 cm (4.7 in).

== Etymology ==
The fish is named in honor of Scottish surgeon-naturalist John Richardson (1787–1865).
