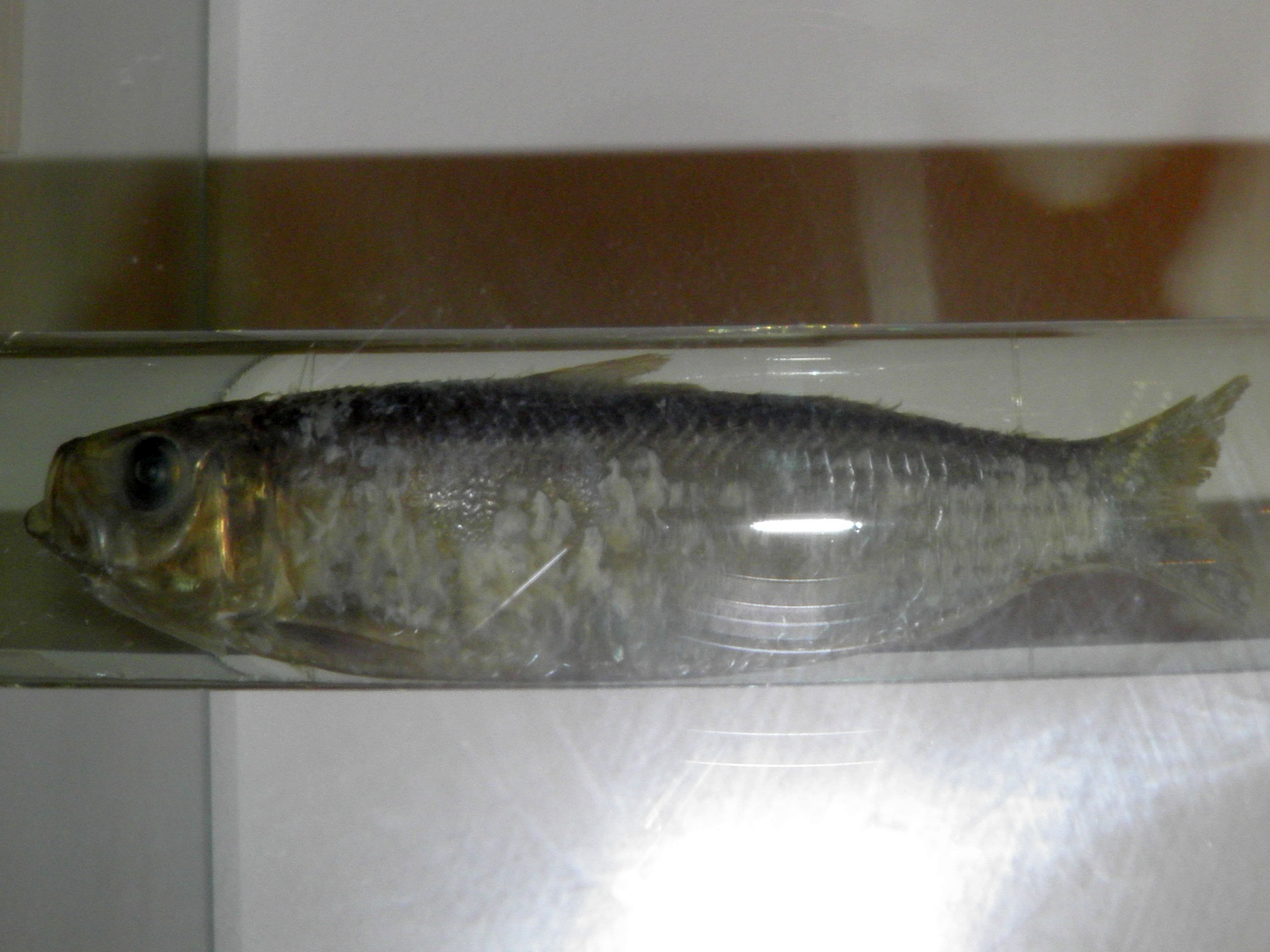
- Sardinella jussieu

Scientific classification
- Kingdom: Animalia
- Phylum: Chordata
- Class: Actinopterygii
- Division: Teleostei
- Order: Clupeiformes
- Family: Dorosomatidae
- Genus: Sardinella
- Species: S. jussieu

Binomial name
- Sardinella jussieu (Lacépède, 1803

= Sardinella jussieu =

Mauritian sardinella

Species of fish

Sardinella jussieu (Mauritian sardinella or goldstripe sardinella) is a species of ray-finned fish in the genus Sardinella.

== Footnotes ==
- Froese, Rainer; Pauly, Daniel (eds.). "Sardinella jussieu". FishBase.
