= Sardinella brachysoma =

Deepbody sardinella

Scientific classification
- Kingdom: Animalia
- Phylum: Chordata
- Class: Actinopterygii
- Order: Clupeiformes
- Family: Dorosomatidae
- Genus: Sardinella
- Species: S. brachysoma

Binomial name
- Sardinella brachysoma Bleeker, 1852

Species of fish

Sardinella brachysoma (deepbody sardinella, Indian herring, or Indian sprat) is a species of ray-finned fish in the genus Sardinella.

== Footnotes ==
- Froese, Rainer; Pauly, Daniel (eds.). "Sardinella brachysoma". FishBase.
