= Sardinella neglecta =

East African sardinella

Scientific classification
- Kingdom: Animalia
- Phylum: Chordata
- Class: Actinopterygii
- Order: Clupeiformes
- Family: Dorosomatidae
- Genus: Sardinella
- Species: S. neglecta

Binomial name
- Sardinella neglecta Wongratana, 1983

Species of fish

Sardinella neglecta (East African sardinella) is a species of ray-finned fish in the genus Sardinella from the Indian Ocean, from the east coast of Africa.

== Footnotes ==
- Froese, Rainer; Pauly, Daniel (eds.). "Sardinella neglecta". FishBase.
