= Sardinella fijiense =

Fiji sardinella

Scientific classification
- Kingdom: Animalia
- Phylum: Chordata
- Class: Actinopterygii
- Order: Clupeiformes
- Family: Dorosomatidae
- Genus: Sardinella
- Species: S. fijiense

Binomial name
- Sardinella fijiense (Fowler & B. A. Bean, 1923)

Synonyms
- Harengula fijiense Fowler & Bean, 1923 (original combination); Harengula fijiensis Fowler & Bean, 1923; Sardinella fijiensis (Fowler & Bean, 1923) (misspelling)

Species of fish

Sardinella fijiense also known as the Fiji sardinella is a species of ray-finned fish in the genus Sardinella.
