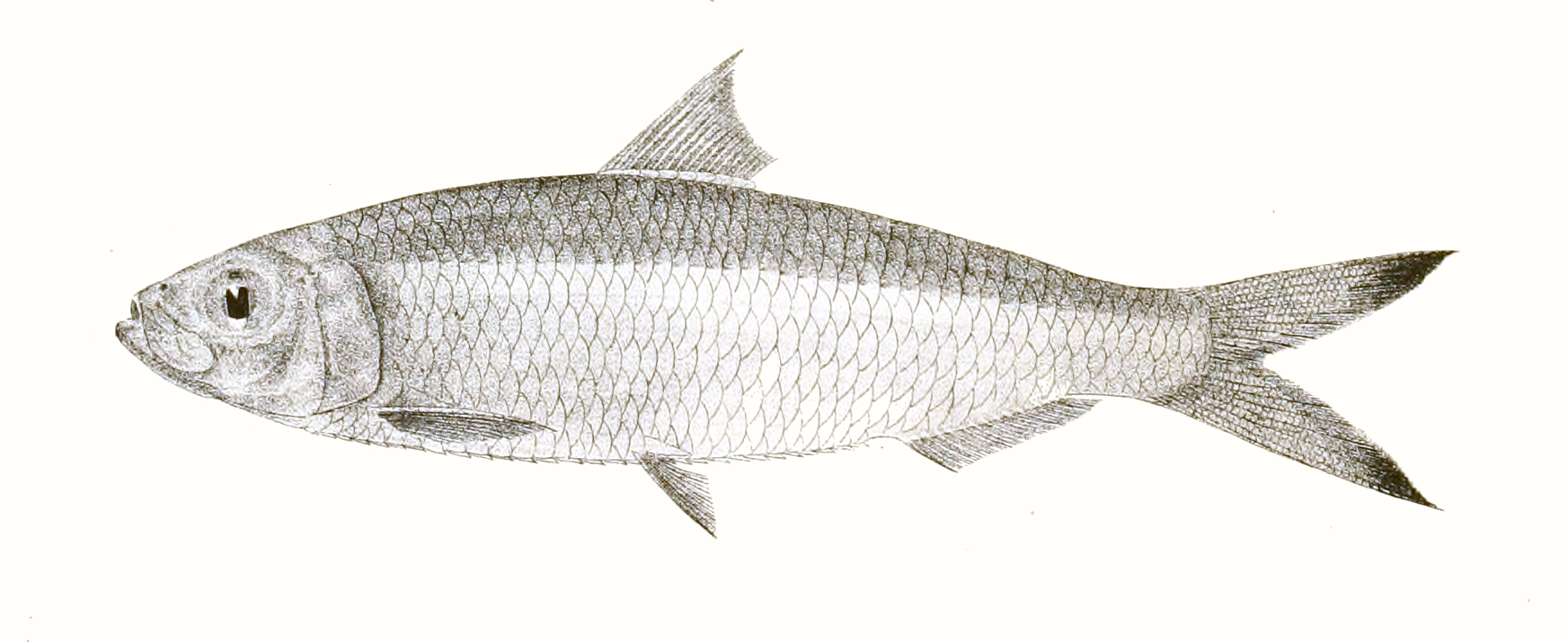
- Sardinella atricauda

Scientific classification
- Domain: Eukaryota
- Kingdom: Animalia
- Phylum: Chordata
- Class: Actinopterygii
- Order: Clupeiformes
- Family: Dorosomatidae
- Genus: Sardinella
- Species: S. atricauda

Binomial name
- Sardinella atricauda (Günther, 1868)

= Sardinella atricauda =

Bleeker's blacktip sardinella

Species of fish

Sardinella atricauda (Bleeker's blacktip sardinella) is a species of ray-finned fish in the genus Sardinella from the western Pacific.

== Footnotes ==
- Froese, Rainer; Pauly, Daniel (eds.). "Sardinella atricauda". FishBase.
