= Sardinella melanura =

Blacktip sardinella

Scientific classification
- Kingdom: Animalia
- Phylum: Chordata
- Class: Actinopterygii
- Division: Teleostei
- Order: Clupeiformes
- Family: Dorosomatidae
- Genus: Sardinella
- Species: S. melanura

Binomial name
- Sardinella melanura (Cuvier, 1829)

Species of fish

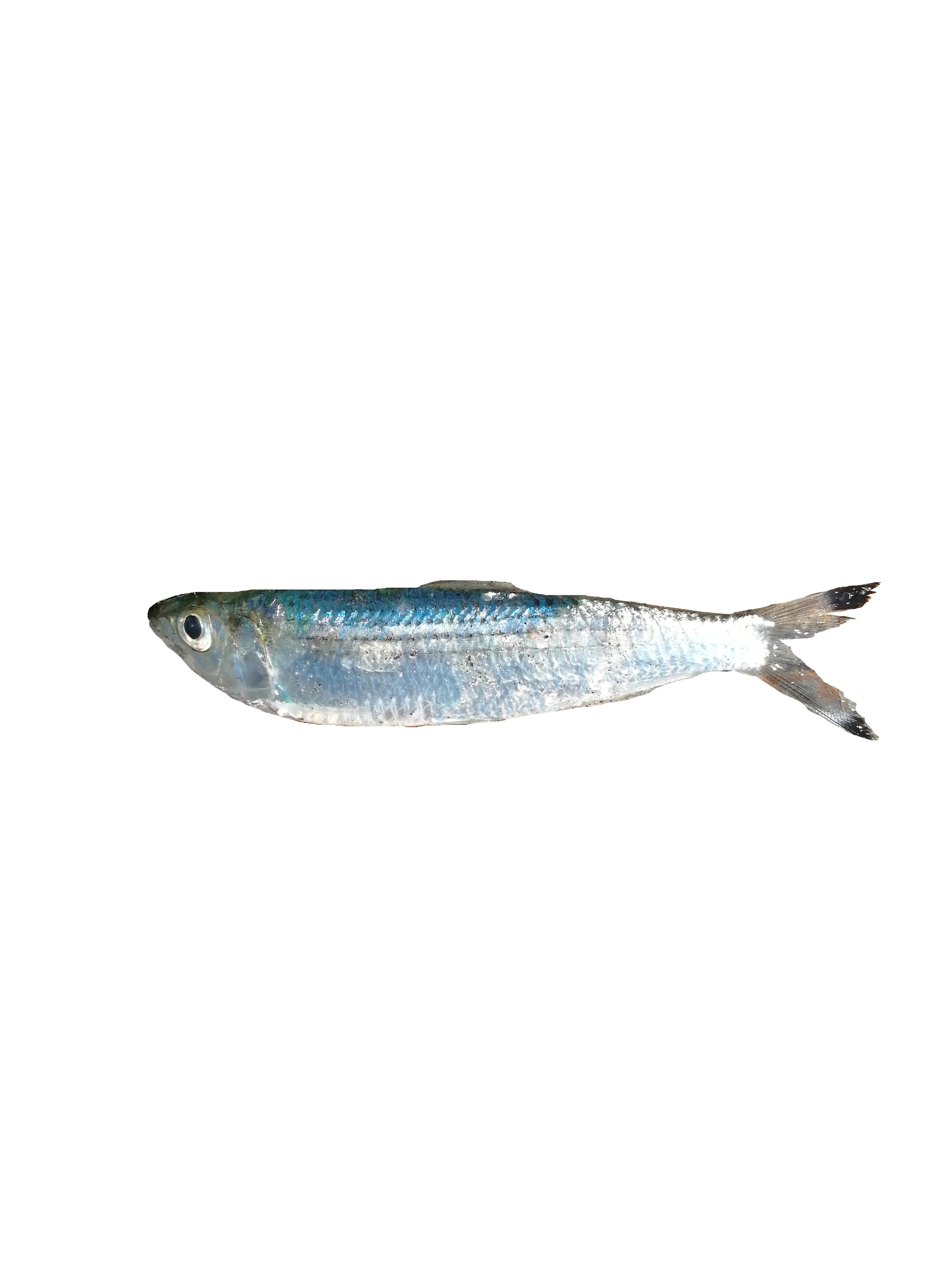

Sardinella melanura (blacktip sardinella) is a species of ray-finned fish in the genus Sardinella.

== Footnotes ==
- Froese, Rainer; Pauly, Daniel (eds.). "Sardinella melanura". FishBase.
