= Slender white sardine =

Conservation status
- Data Deficient (IUCN 3.1)

Scientific classification
- Kingdom: Animalia
- Phylum: Chordata
- Class: Actinopterygii
- Division: Teleostei
- Order: Clupeiformes
- Family: Dorosomatidae
- Genus: Escualosa
- Species: E. elongata

Binomial name
- Escualosa elongata Wongratana, 1983

Species of fish

The slender white sardine (Escualosa elongata) is a species of ray-finned fish belonging to the family Dorosomatidae in the genus Escualosa. It was described by Thosaporn Wongratana in 1983. It is a tropical fish which was discovered at a Sunday market in Bangkok, Thailand, though the two specimens (holotype: BMNH 1973.1.18.1; paratype: CUB (uncat. 1)) were caught off the eastern coast of the Gulf of Thailand. The sardines are known to swim at a maximum depth of 50 metres. The largest known standard length for the species is 6.7 centimetres (2.64 inches). It is distinguished from its sister species, Escualosa thoracata (the white sardine) by having a slenderer body, earning it its common name, and also by a silver band on its flank.
