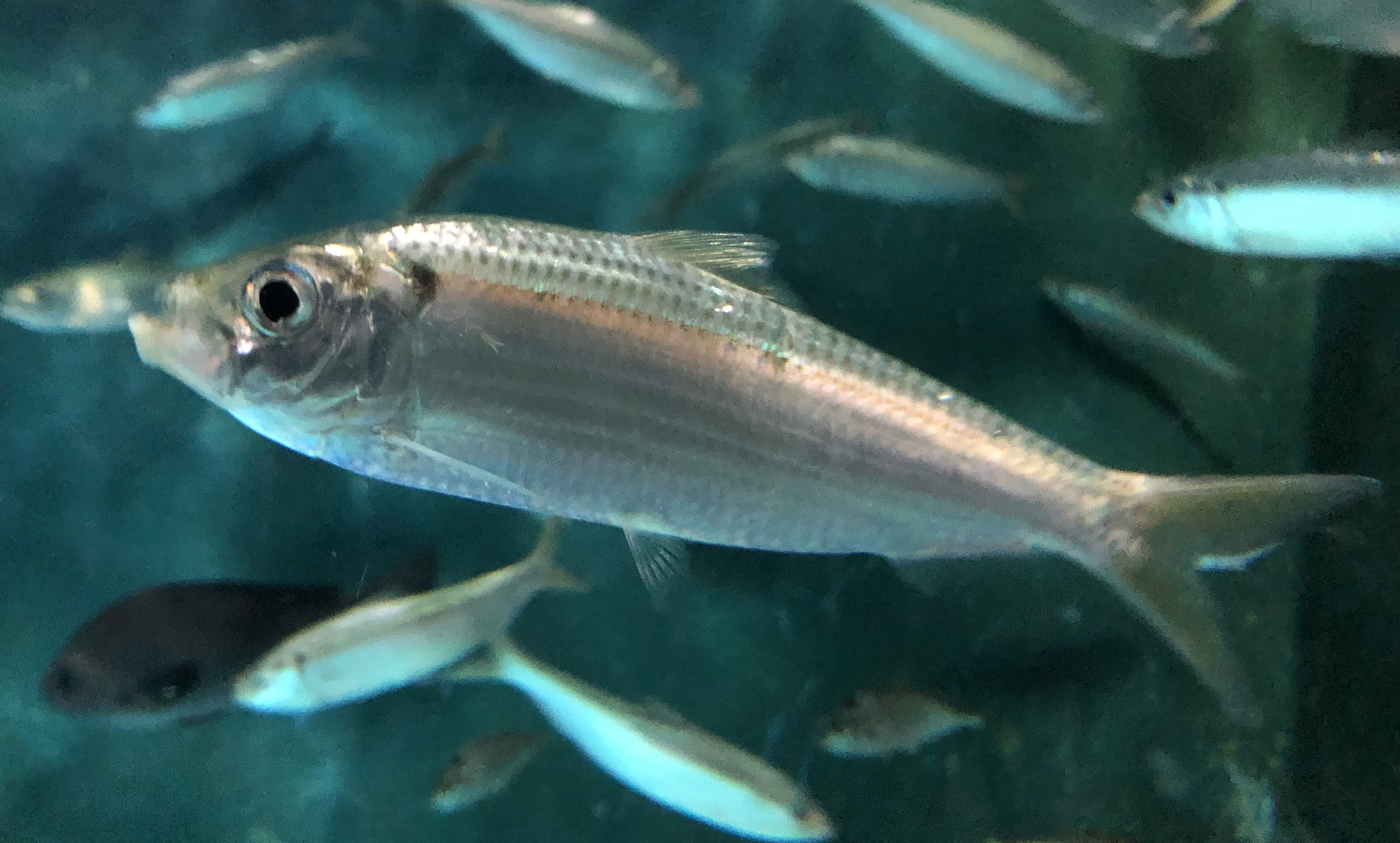

Conservation status
- Least Concern (IUCN 3.1)

Scientific classification
- Kingdom: Animalia
- Phylum: Chordata
- Class: Actinopterygii
- Order: Clupeiformes
- Family: Dorosomatidae
- Genus: Sardinella
- Species: S. zunasi

Binomial name
- Sardinella zunasi (Bleeker, 1854)

Synonyms
- Harengula zunasi Bleeker, 1854

= Sardinella zunasi =

Species of fish

Sardinella zunasi (Japanese sardinella or Japanese scaled sardine) is a species of ray-finned fish in the family Clupeidae, the herrings and sardines. It is native to the northwestern Pacific Ocean, where it occurs near shore along the Asian coastlines from southern Japan to Taiwan.

This fish is usually around 10 centimeters long at maturity. It is usually slender, but its body shape is somewhat variable.

This marine fish lives in schools in coastal waters, and can sometimes be found in bays. Some populations are known to overwinter in the Yellow Sea. In the spring, it spawns in the open ocean and in semi-enclosed shoreline habitat. The eggs hatch in about 36 hours. The larvae are adaptable to a wide range of temperatures and salinities.

Studies of its mitochondrial DNA reveal that the species is divided genetically into three main lineages. The split may have occurred when two populations were isolated from the main one by low sea levels during glaciation events.

== As food ==
This is a commercially important fish in Japan and China. It has been heavily fished and is considered an overexploited resource. It is also commonly found in fishery bycatch. In Japan, it is known as sappa or mamakari and in Korea as baendaeng'i (밴댕이).

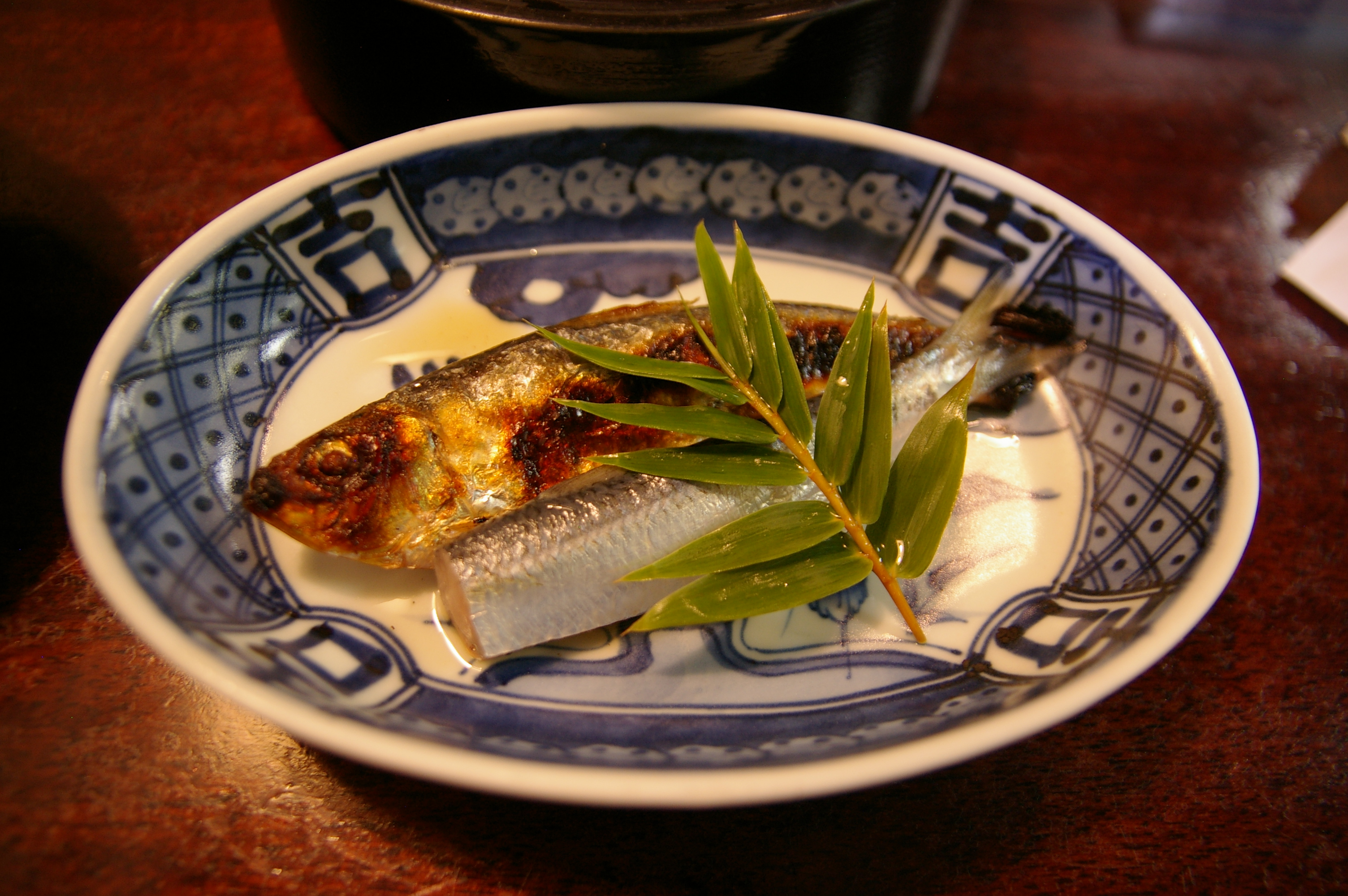

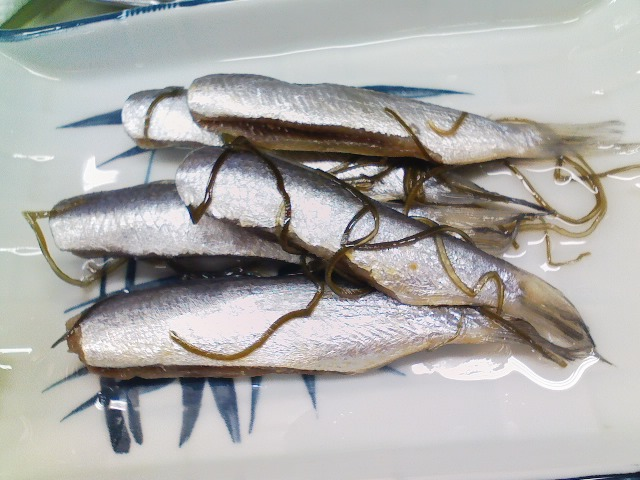

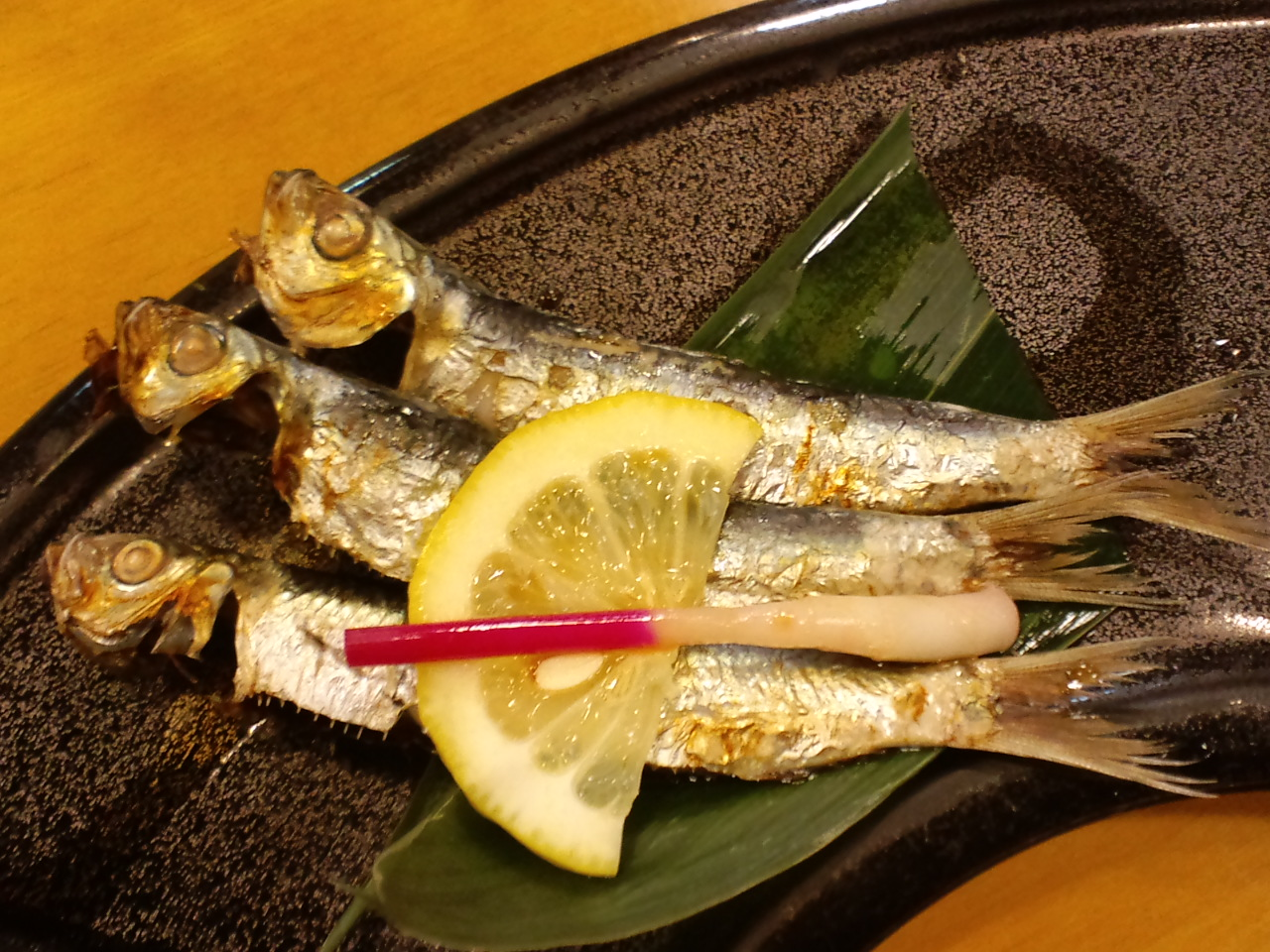

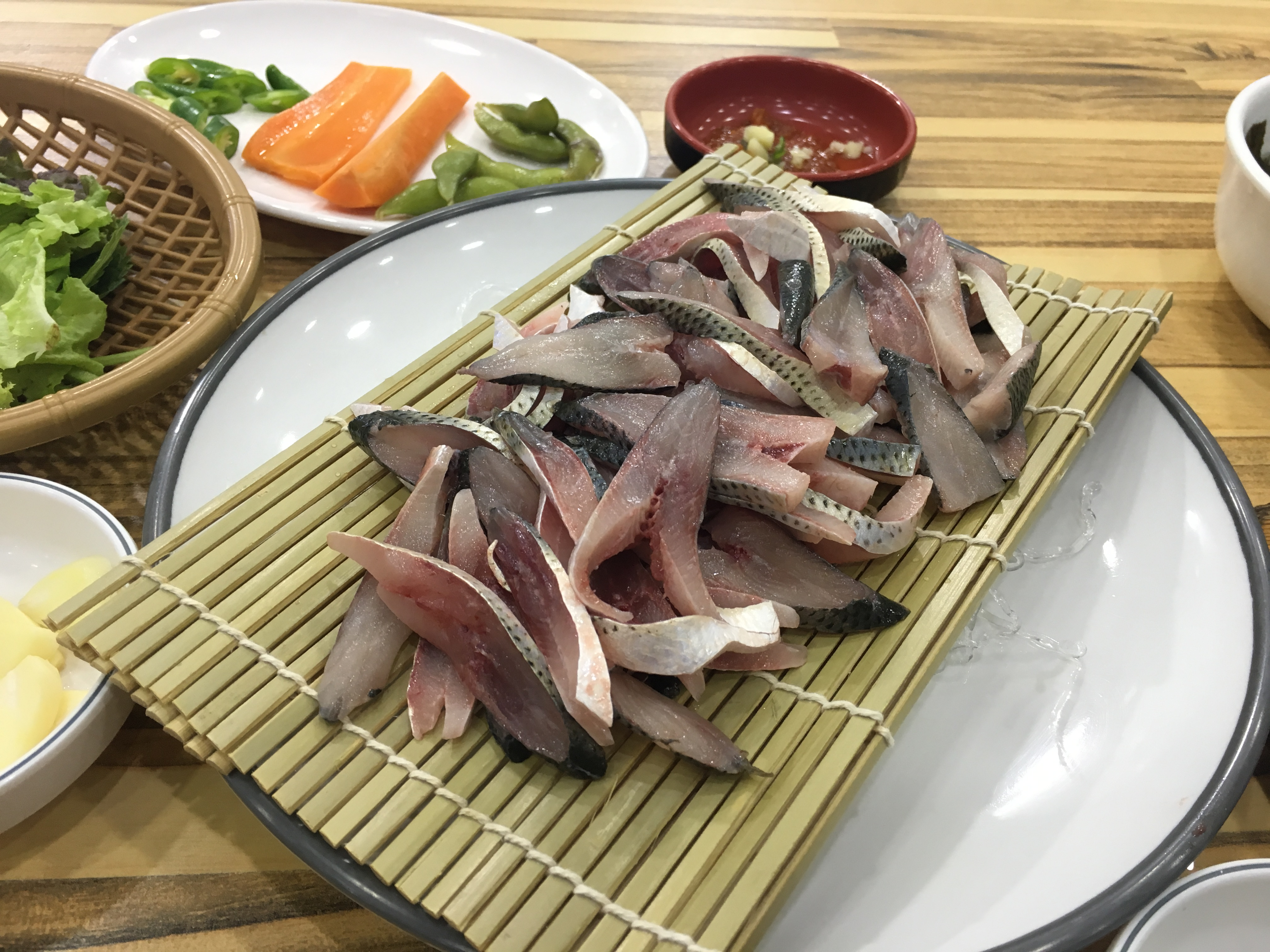
Korean raw hoe

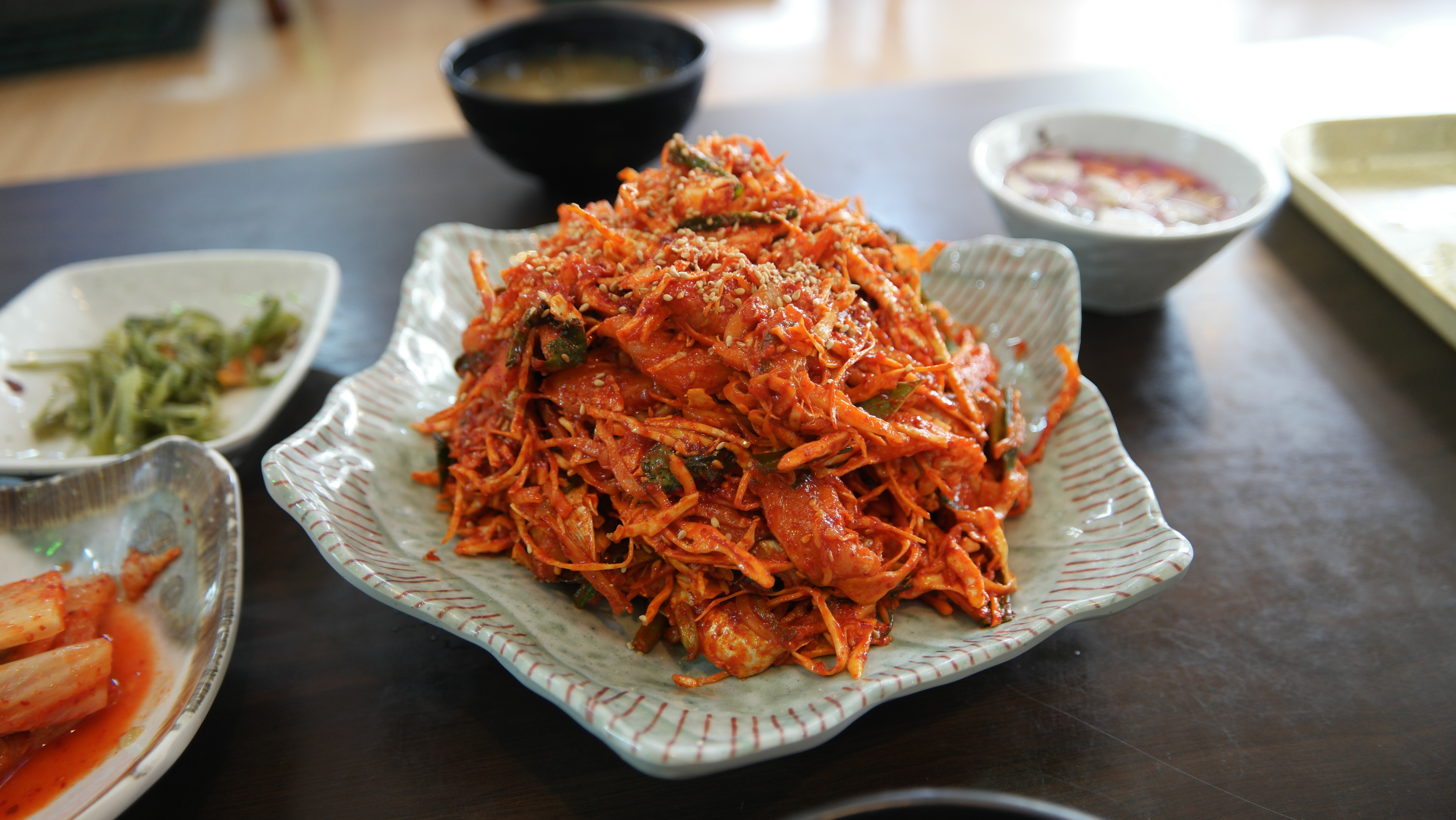
Hoe
