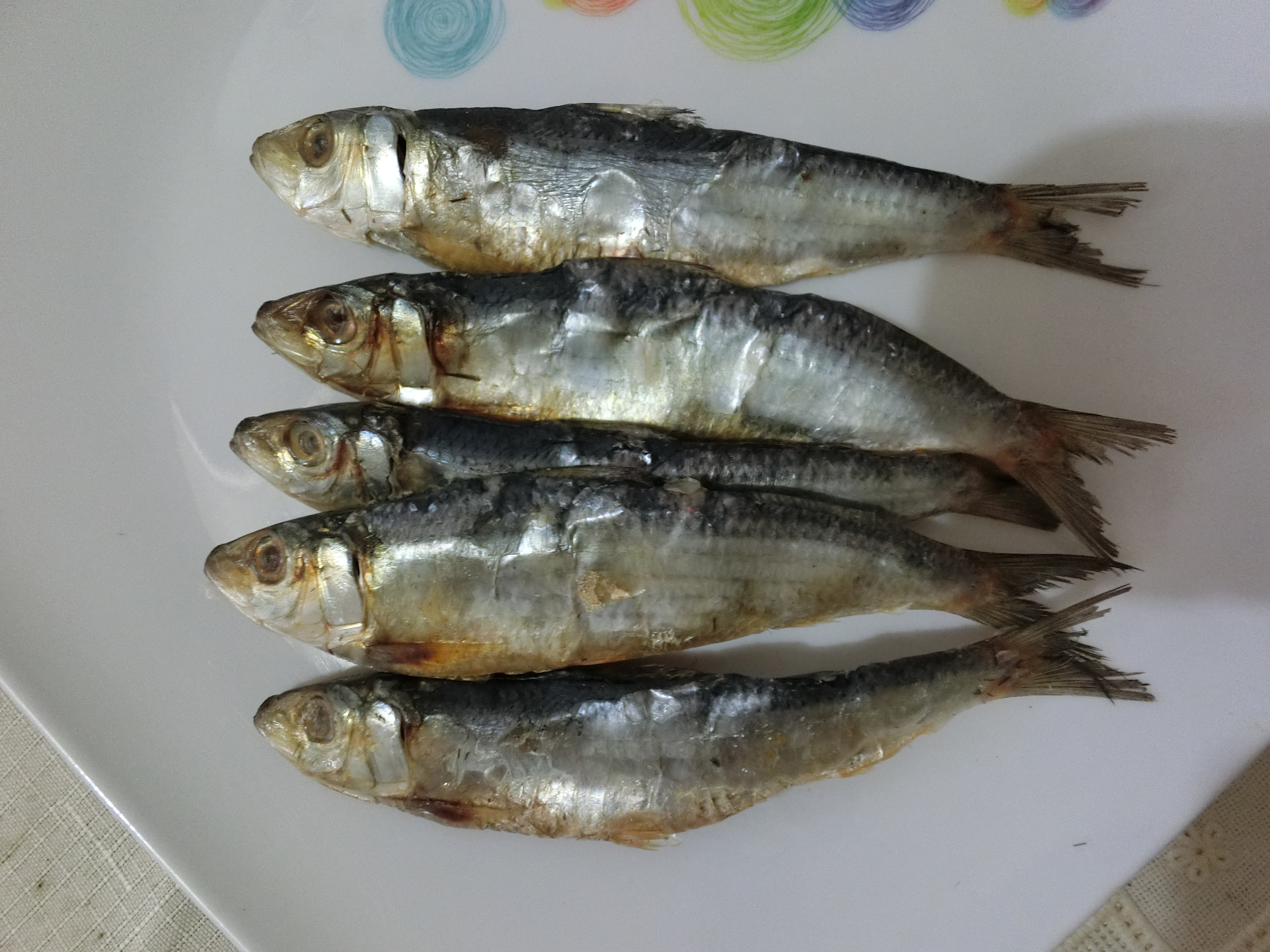

Scientific classification
- Kingdom: Animalia
- Phylum: Chordata
- Class: Actinopterygii
- Order: Clupeiformes
- Family: Dorosomatidae
- Genus: Sardinella
- Species: S. fimbriata

Binomial name
- Sardinella fimbriata (Valenciennes, 1847)

= Sardinella fimbriata =

Fringescale sardinella

Species of fish

Sardinella fimbriata (fringescale sardinella) is a species of ray-finned fish in the genus Sardinella.

== Footnotes ==
- Froese, Rainer; Pauly, Daniel (eds.). "Sardinella fimbriata". FishBase.
