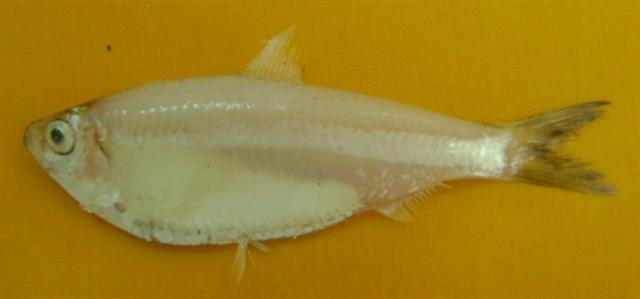
- Escualosa thoracata

Scientific classification
- Domain: Eukaryota
- Kingdom: Animalia
- Phylum: Chordata
- Class: Actinopterygii
- Order: Clupeiformes
- Family: Dorosomatidae
- Genus: Escualosa; Whitley, 1940

= Escualosa =

Genus of fishes

Escualosa is a genus of fishes in the herring family, Dorosomatidae. The genus currently contains two described species. They are found in Indo-Pacific.

== Species ==
- Escualosa elongata Wongratana, 1983 (Slender white sardine)
- Escualosa thoracata (Valenciennes, 1847) (White sardine)
