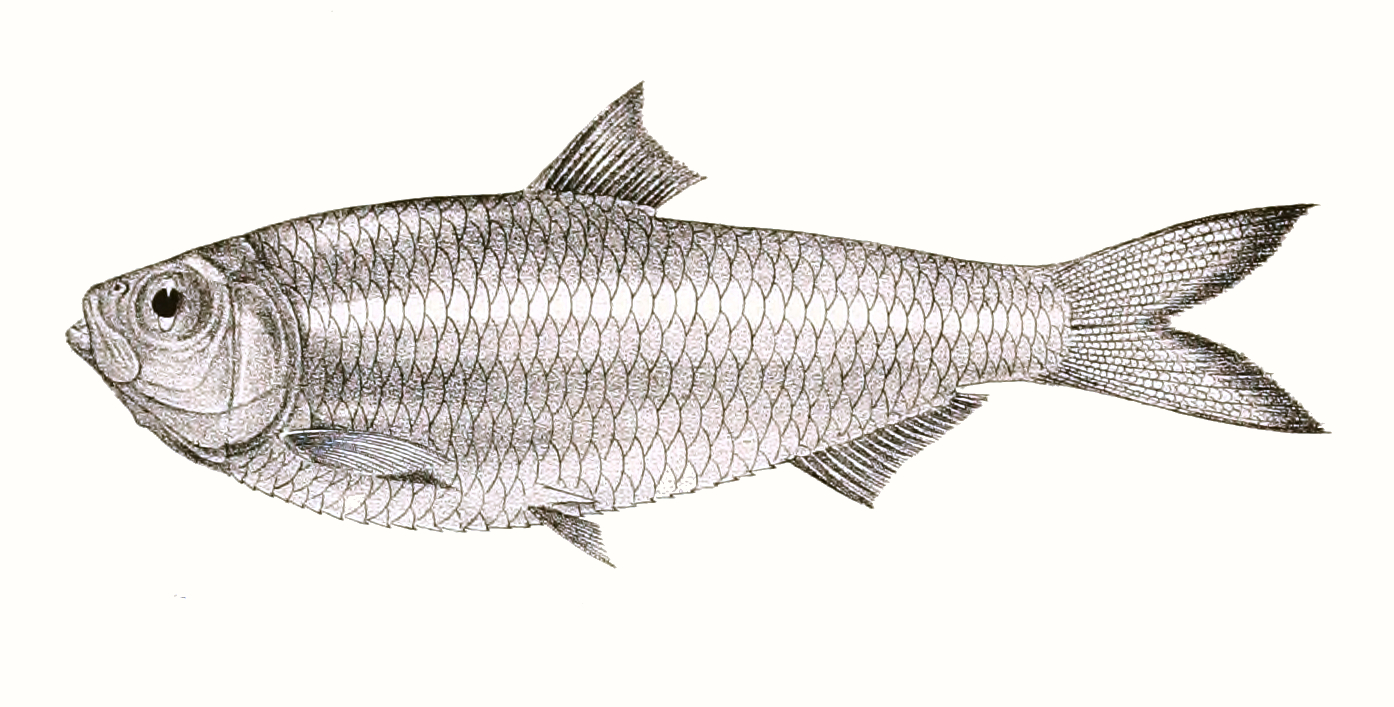
- illustration

Conservation status
- Least Concern (IUCN 3.1)

Scientific classification
- Kingdom: Animalia
- Phylum: Chordata
- Class: Actinopterygii
- Order: Clupeiformes
- Family: Dorosomatidae
- Genus: Escualosa
- Species: E. thoracata

Binomial name
- Escualosa thoracata (Valenciennes, 1847)

Synonyms
- Kowala thoracata Valenciennes, 1847; Esculaosa thoracata (Valenciennes, 1847); Clupea coval Cuvier, 1829; Kowala coval (Cuvier, 1829); Meletta lile Valenciennes, 1847; Clupeoides lile (Valenciennes, 1847); Clupoides lile (Valenciennes, 1847); Rogenia argyrotaenia Bleeker, 1852; Clupea argyrotaenia (Bleeker, 1852); Rogenia argijrotaenia Bleeker, 1852; Clupea macrolepis Steindachner, 1879

= Escualosa thoracata =

Species of fish

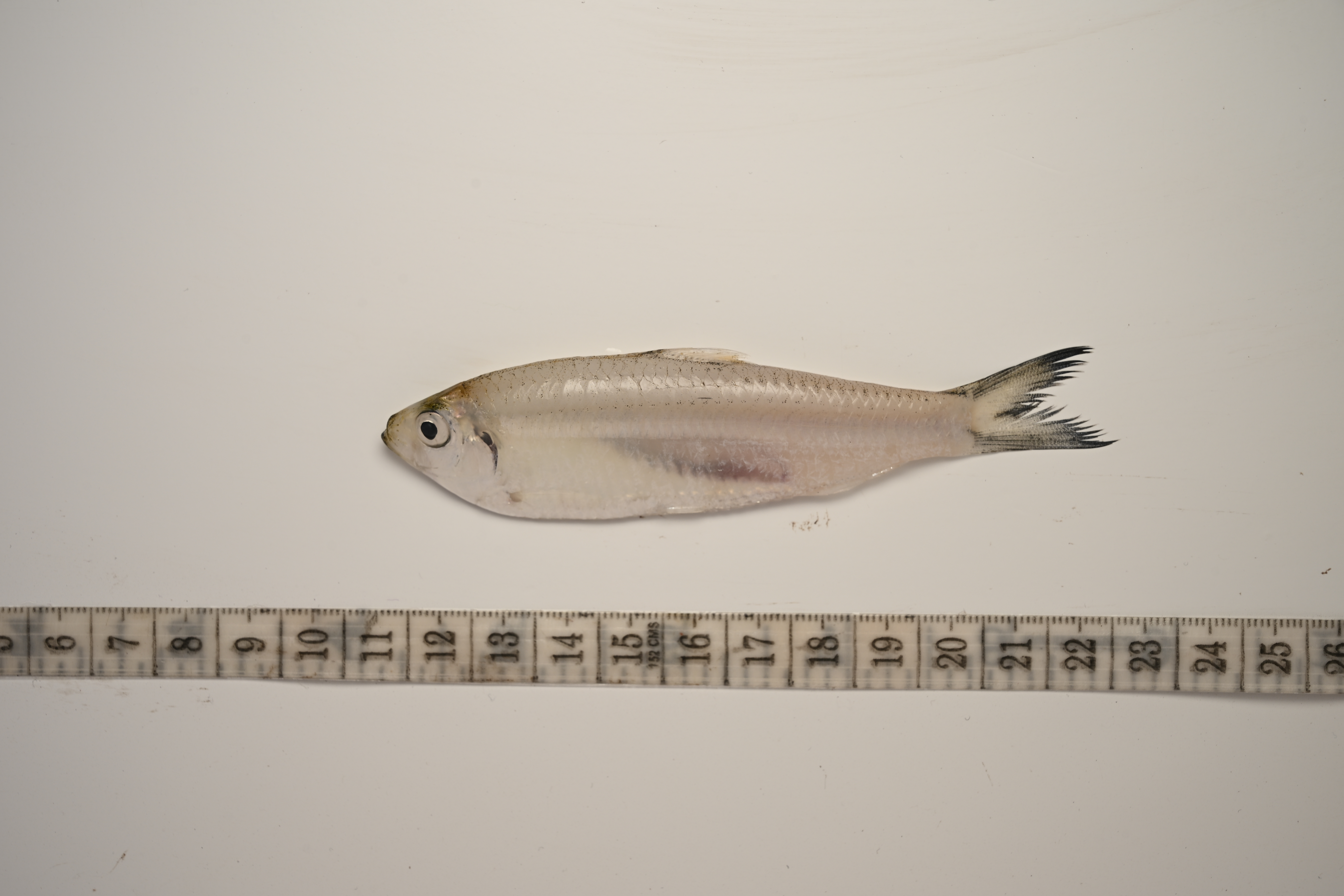
Escualosa thoracata

The white sardine (Escualosa thoracata) is a species of fish in the family Clupeidae. It was described by Achille Valenciennes in 1847. It is a tropical fish of the Indo-Pacific distributed from Thailand to Indonesia and Australia. Other common names include deep herring and northern herring.

This species is amphidromous. It is known to swim at a maximum depth of 50 metres. The largest known standard length for the species is 10 cm. It is distinguished from its sister species, Escualosa elongata, the slender white sardine, by its deeper body and broader silver band. The white sardine feeds on zooplankton and phytoplankton. It is a commercially important fish, used fresh and dried.
