= Sardinella lemuru =

Bali sardinella

Scientific classification
- Kingdom: Animalia
- Phylum: Chordata
- Class: Actinopterygii
- Order: Clupeiformes
- Family: Dorosomatidae
- Genus: Sardinella
- Species: S. lemuru

Binomial name
- Sardinella lemuru Bleeker, 1853

Species of fish

Sardinella lemuru (Bali sardinella) is a species of ray-finned fish in the genus Sardinella found in the Eastern Indian Ocean and in the Western Pacific Ocean, in the area that stretches from southern Japan through the Malay Archipelago to the western Australia.

== Commercial Uses ==
Bali sardinella is an important species used in Indonesian feed mills to supply shrimp feed, as well as in imported fishmeal. Bali sardinella is also eaten fresh or processed. Processed Bali sardinella may be found as canned, boiled-salted, or fish flakes.
