= Richardson's leaf-toed gecko =

Scientific classification
- Domain: Eukaryota
- Kingdom: Animalia
- Phylum: Chordata
- Class: Reptilia
- Order: Squamata
- Infraorder: Gekkota
- Family: Gekkonidae
- Genus: Hemidactylus
- Species: H. richardsonii

Binomial name
- Hemidactylus richardsonii (Gray, 1845)

Synonyms
- Velernesia richardsonii

Species of lizard

Richardson's leaf-toed gecko (Hemidactylus richardsonii) is a species of gecko. It is found in central Africa (Cameroon, Gabon, the Republic of the Congo, the Democratic Republic of the Congo, and the Central African Republic).
