= Marquesan sardinella =

Scientific classification
- Domain: Eukaryota
- Kingdom: Animalia
- Phylum: Chordata
- Class: Actinopterygii
- Order: Clupeiformes
- Family: Dorosomatidae
- Genus: Sardinella
- Species: S. marquesensis

Binomial name
- Sardinella marquesensis Berry & Whitehead, 1968

Species of fish

The Marquesan sardinella (Sardinella marquesensis) is a species of ray-finned fish in the genus Sardinella endemic to the Marquesas Islands.

== Footnotes ==
- Froese, Rainer; Pauly, Daniel (eds.). "Sardinella marquesensis". FishBase.
