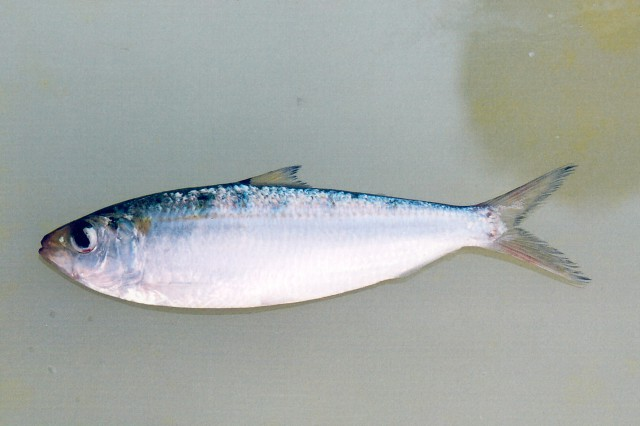

Scientific classification
- Kingdom: Animalia
- Phylum: Chordata
- Class: Actinopterygii
- Division: Teleostei
- Order: Clupeiformes
- Family: Dorosomatidae
- Genus: Sardinella
- Species: S. gibbosa

Binomial name
- Sardinella gibbosa (Bleeker, 1849)

Synonyms
- Clupea gibbosa Bleeker, 1849; Harengula gibbosa (Bleeker, 1849); Spratella tembang Bleeker, 1851; Clupea immaculata Kishinouye, 1908; Sardinia immaculata (Kishinouye, 1908); Fimbriclupea dactylolepis Whitley, 1940; Sardinella dactylolepis (Whitley, 1940); Sardinella taiwanensis Raja & Hiyama, 1969

= Goldstripe sardinella =

Species of fish

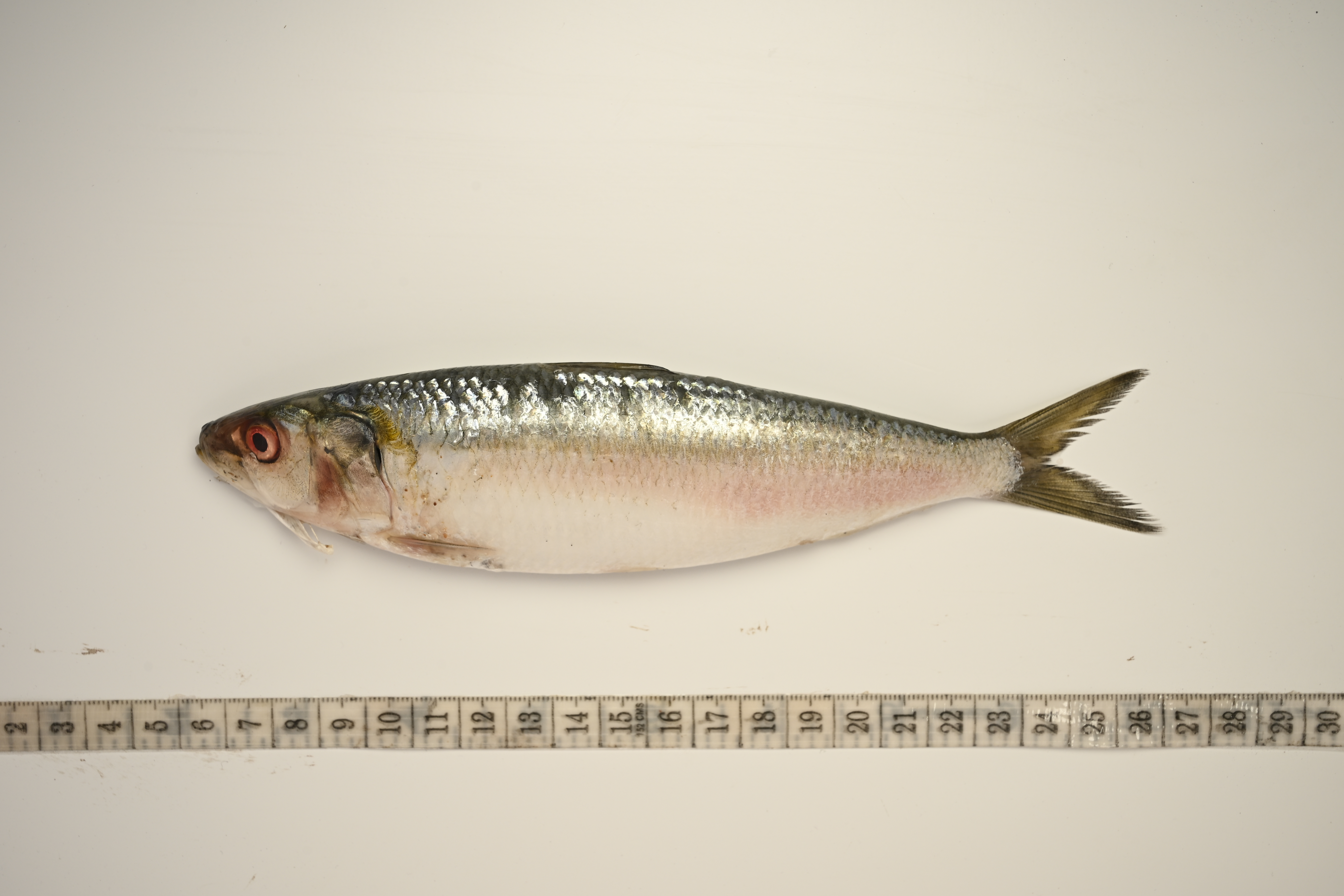
Sardinella gibbosa

The goldstripe sardinella (Sardinella gibbosa) or goldstripe sardine is a species of fish of the family Clupeidae. It is native to shallow tropical waters of the western Indo-Pacific, living at depths down to 70 m, and being associated with coral reefs. It grows up to 17 cm in length and forms large schools.

It is an important commercial fish, and is eaten dried, salted, boiled, or made into fish balls.

== Reproduction ==
S. gibbosa have unique eggs because they do not possess a wide perivitelline space (an important aspect to sardinella eggs and most pelagic fish). Some scientists do not consider this species a true member of the Sardinella genus for this reason. The spawning season for these fish ranges from April to October. In this species there is a trend of smaller fish spawning earlier in the spawning season. Peak spawning occurs in June and July and this is followed by the older larger specimens which tend to move into the spawning areas later in the season

== Age determination ==
The determination of age in this species has proved difficult because there are small rings present on the scales called annuli. However, it is very difficult to determine their true cause. These annuli are often interrupted or indented in the patterns on the scales (striae) are often interrupted or indented. The spaces between striae are often lighter in color especially in comparison to the rest of the striated region of the scale. In comparison, salmon and trout form much more distinct annuli according to rings forming closer to one another during different seasons of the year. In essence, the debate is whether these annuli are spawning rings or whether they develop as a result of some unknown cause and unknown time frame. This information is ineffective as a measure of the age of the fish until these issues are cleared and definitive.

== Commercial production ==
Global capture production of Goldstripe sardinella (Sardinella gibbosa) in thousand tonnes from 1950 to 2022, as reported by the FAO

Dried Sardinella gibbosa is a favorite especially in Korean markets. These fish are advertised as dried herring in Korea, England, Sweden and Canada. The process by which Vietnamese Gold Stripe Sardinella are made available includes being washed, steamed, sun dried, packed and preserved. These fish are important in fisheries in parts of India and throughout Southeast Asia.

== Distinguishing features ==
The goldstripe sardinella has a relatively slender body, and a below average number of gill rakers, with unique, small perforations on the hind part of their scales along with a dark spot on the dorsal fin.

== Distribution ==
The distribution of S. gibbosa includes the Indo-West Pacific, East African coast, and a range from Madagascar to Indonesia. First recorded in 2008 in the Mediterranean Sea off Israel, it is strongly suspected to be present in other locations due to its resemblance to Sardinella maderensis. S. gibbosa is one of the most abundant Sardinella in Indo West Pacific, and off the coast of Taiwan, Korea and Australia. Fisheries are most prominent in southern parts of India, with markets throughout Southeast Asia
