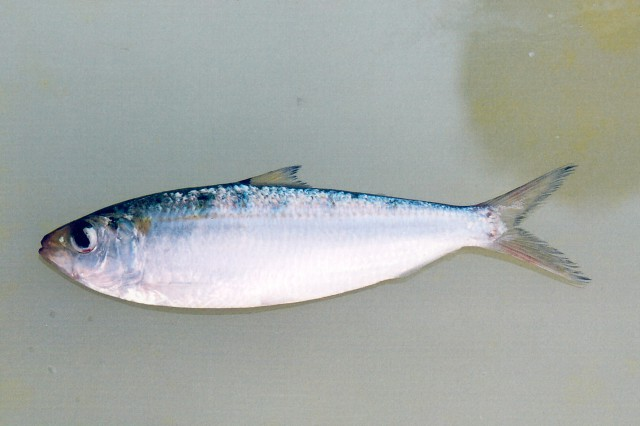
- Sardinella gibbosa
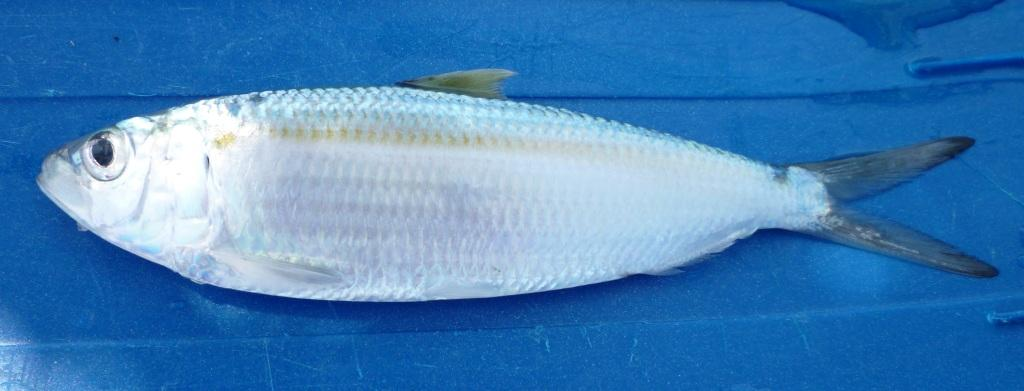
- Sardinella maderensis

Scientific classification
- Kingdom: Animalia
- Phylum: Chordata
- Class: Actinopterygii
- Division: Teleostei
- Order: Clupeiformes
- Suborder: Clupeoidei
- Family: Dorosomatidae
- Genus: Sardinella; Valenciennes, 1847

Type species
- Sardinella aurita Valenciennes, 1847

Synonyms
- Clupalosa Bleeker, 1849; Clupeonia Valenciennes, 1847; Fimbriclupea Whitley, 1940; Fiscina Whitley, 1940; Kowala Valenciennes, 1847; Paralosa Bleeker, 1868; Sardinia Poey, 1860; Wilkesina Fowler & B. A. Bean, 1923

= Sardinella =

Sardinella Temporal range: 47.8–0 Ma Middle Eocene to Present

Genus of fishes

Sardinella is a genus of fish in the family Dorosomatidae found in the Atlantic, Indian and Pacific Oceans. They are abundant in warmer waters of the tropical and subtropical oceans. Adults are generally coastal, schooling, marine fish but juveniles are often found in lagoons and estuaries. These species are distinguished by their ranges and by specific body features, but they are often confused with one another. Fish of the genus have seven to 14 striped markings along the scales of the top of the head. The paddle-shaped supramaxilla bones are characteristic; they separate Sardinella from other genera and their shapes help distinguish species. They have paired predorsal scales and enlarged fin rays.

== Species ==
There are currently 27 recognized species in this genus:

- Sardinella albella (Valenciennes, 1847) (White sardinella)
- Sardinella alcyone Hata & Motomura, 2019 (Blueback sardinella)
- Sardinella atricauda (Günther, 1868) (Bleeker's blacktip sardinella)
- Sardinella aurita Valenciennes, 1847 (Round sardinella)
- Sardinella brachysoma Bleeker, 1852 (Deep-body sardinella)
- Sardinella brasiliensis (Steindachner, 1879) (Brazilian sardinella)
- Sardinella dayi Regan, 1917 (Day's sardinella)
- Sardinella electra Hata & Motomura, 2019 (Island Sardinella)
- Sardinella fijiense (Fowler & B. A. Bean, 1923) (Fiji sardinella)
- Sardinella fimbriata (Valenciennes, 1847) (Fringe-scale sardinella)
- Sardinella gibbosa (Bleeker, 1849) (Gold-stripe sardinella)
- Sardinella goni Stern, Rinkevich & Goren, 2016 (Gon's sardinella)
- Sardinella hualiensis (K. Y. Chu & C. F. Tsai, 1958) (Taiwan sardinella)
- Sardinella jussieu (Lacépède, 1803) (Mauritian sardinella)
- Sardinella lemuru Bleeker, 1853 (Bali sardinella)
- Sardinella longiceps Valenciennes, 1847 (Indian sardinella)
- Sardinella maderensis (R. T. Lowe, 1838) (Madeiran sardinella)
- Sardinella marquesensis Berry & Whitehead, 1968 (Marquesan sardinella)
- Sardinella melanura (G. Cuvier, 1829) (Black-tip sardinella)
- Sardinella neglecta Wongratana, 1983 (East African sardinella)
- Sardinella pacifica Hata & Motomura, 2019
- Sardinella richardsoni Wongratana, 1983 (Richardson's sardinella)
- Sardinella rouxi (Poll, 1953) (Yellow-tail sardinella)
- Sardinella sindensis (F. Day, 1878) (Sind sardinella)
- Sardinella tawilis (Herre, 1927) (Fresh-water sardinella)
- Sardinella ventura Hata & Motomura, 2021 (Fortune sardinella)
- Sardinella zunasi (Bleeker, 1854) (Japanese sardinella)
