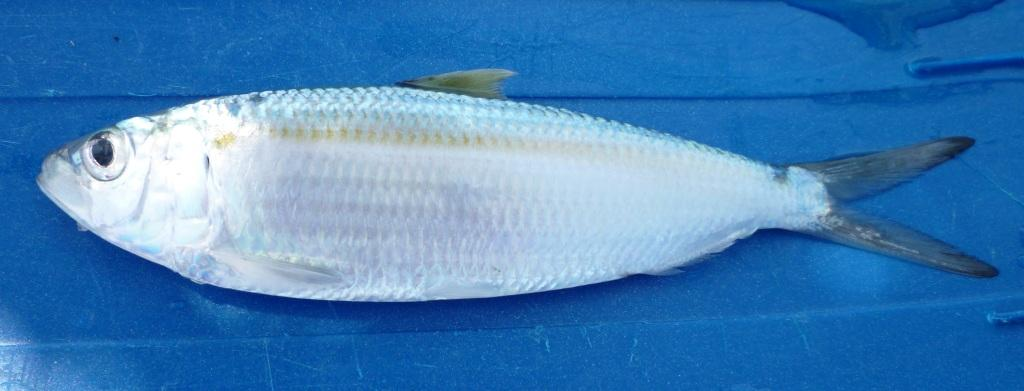

Conservation status
- Vulnerable (IUCN 3.1)

Scientific classification
- Kingdom: Animalia
- Phylum: Chordata
- Class: Actinopterygii
- Order: Clupeiformes
- Family: Dorosomatidae
- Genus: Sardinella
- Species: S. maderensis

Binomial name
- Sardinella maderensis (R. T. Lowe, 1838)

= Sardinella maderensis =

Madeiran sardinella

Species of fish

Global capture production of Madeiran sardinella (Sardinella maderensis) in thousand tonnes from 1970 to 2022, as reported by the FAO

Sardinella maderensis (Madeiran sardinella) is a species of small ray-finned fish in the genus Sardinella which is found in the Eastern Atlantic and Southeastern Mediterranean. it is a silvery fish similar to the round sardinella (Sardinella aurita), but can be distinguished from that species by having gray caudal fins with black tips. It feeds on phytoplankton and fish larvae and is a pelagic, oceanodromous species that forms schools in coastal waters, often mixed with S. aurita. The International Union for Conservation of Nature has rated this fish's conservation status as "vulnerable".

== Diagnostic features ==
S. madarensis is a distinctly elongate Sardinella while also having a variably protruding belly. These fish have a median number of gill rakers and their upper pectoral fin rays are white on the outer side with a black membrane in between. They are very hard to distinguish from Sardinella aurita except that these fish have only 7 rays on their pelvic fins and no black spot on the hind part of their gill cover. They also have a gray caudal fin (see Fish anatomy) with black tips.

== Recent history ==
S. madarensis catches have decreased from 1.8 tonnes per trip in 2003 down to 1.5 tonnes in the following two years. The major fishing grounds for these fish are off the coasts of Senegal and Morocco. Over the course of the last ten years the average size of these fish has decreased down from 35 cm to 32 cm. Experts say that these changes are in large part due to very active Dutch commercial fishing in the region.

== Habitats ==
These Sardinella can handle very low salinities when they travel into estuaries and lagoons and spend most of their lives near the surface of the water. They feed on phytoplankton and fish larvae. These are some of the larger fish in the genus and grow to as much as 35 cm.

== Status ==
The population of the Madeiran sardinella is declining as both it and S. aurita are being overexploited, with the average size of fish in the catch reducing. As a result, the International Union for Conservation of Nature has rated its conservation status as "vulnerable".
