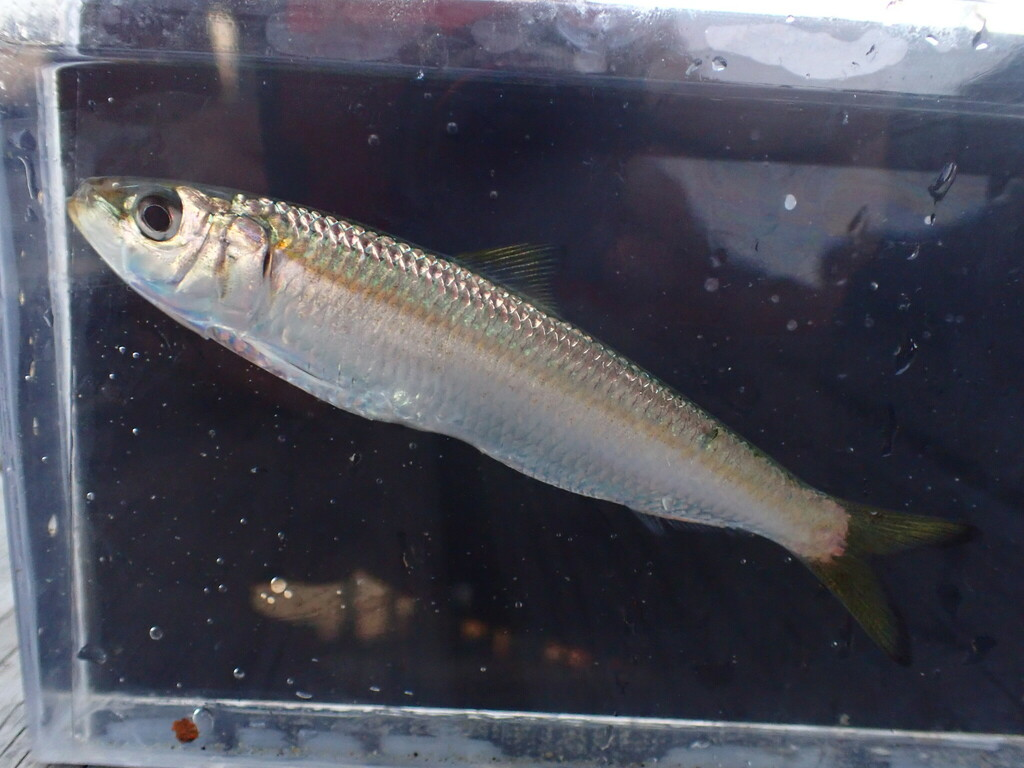

Conservation status
- Least Concern (IUCN 3.1)

Scientific classification
- Kingdom: Animalia
- Phylum: Chordata
- Class: Actinopterygii
- Division: Teleostei
- Order: Clupeiformes
- Family: Dorosomatidae
- Genus: Sardinella
- Species: S. aurita

Binomial name
- Sardinella aurita Valenciennes, 1847

= Round sardinella =

Species of fish

The round sardinella (Sardinella aurita), sometimes known as Spanish sardine, is a species of ray-finned fish in the genus Sardinella found in both sides of the Atlantic Ocean and the Mediterranean Sea.

S. aurita went through a large boom in catch population around 1990. However, its numbers have been very stable through the last several years.

S. aurita inhabits warm waters. It is a small, pelagic species that lives in tropical and subtropical waters of the western and eastern Atlantic Ocean, the Pacific Ocean, the Mediterranean, and occasionally, the Black Sea. The gonads start to develop in April and are fully mature one month later. Plankton in spawning regions are full of eggs and larvae from the end of June into September.

== Diagnostic features ==
Sardinella aurita has a particularly elongated body, a relatively rounded belly, and a large number of fine gill rakers (up to 160). This is one of the largest Sardinella species, averaging 23 to 28 cm (9.1 to 11.0 in). It has eight pelvic fin rays. It has frontoparietal stripes on the top of its head, a faint golden midlateral line, and a distinctive black spot on the hind border of the gill cover. It is often caught along with Sardinella longiceps, and the two are not easily distinguished.

== Habitat ==
The fish prefer shallower waters around 24 °C (75 °F). It reaches depths of 350 m (1,150 ft). It is a schooling fish that feeds on phytoplankton and zooplankton such as copepods.

== Fisheries ==
Global capture production of Round sardinella (Sardinella aurita) in thousand tonnes from 1950 to 2022, as reported by the FAO

Fisheries for this species exist off the West African coast, in the Mediterranean Sea, and along the coasts of Venezuela and Brazil. Fishery numbers in 1983 totaled 1,983,000 tons.
