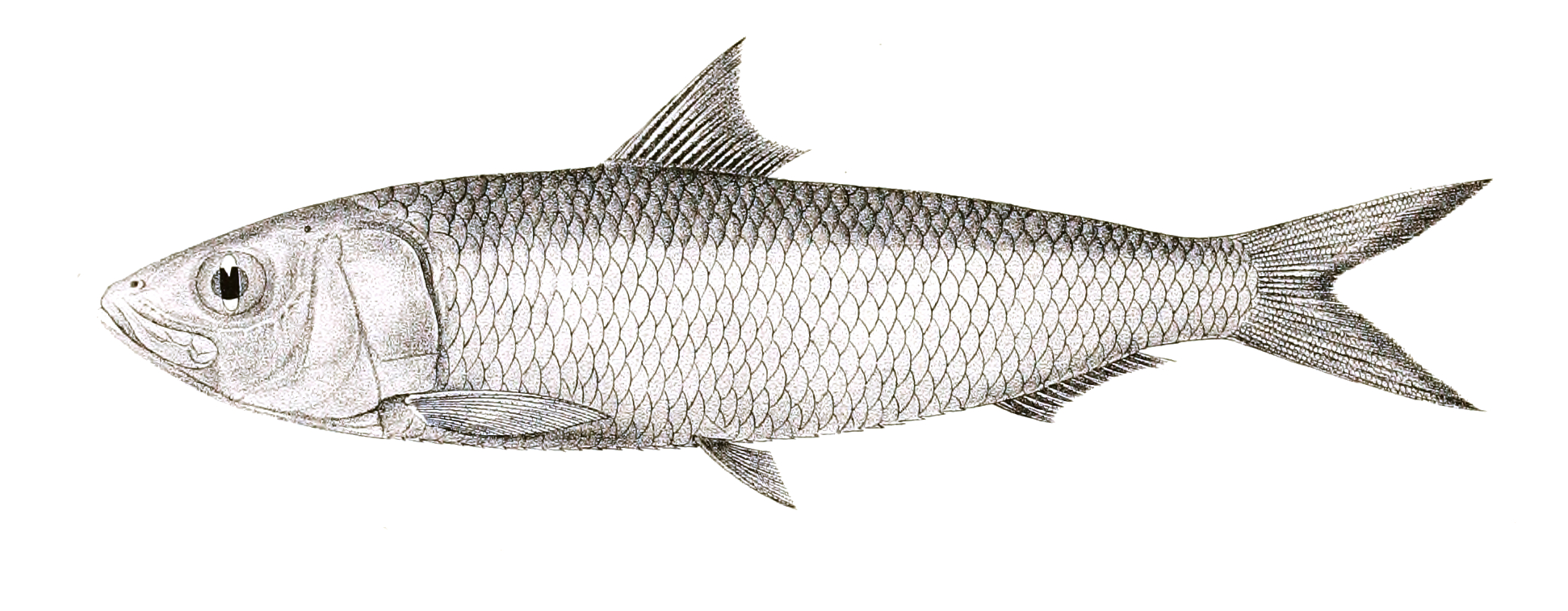

Scientific classification
- Kingdom: Animalia
- Phylum: Chordata
- Class: Actinopterygii
- Order: Clupeiformes
- Family: Dorosomatidae
- Genus: Sardinella
- Species: S. longiceps

Binomial name
- Sardinella longiceps Valenciennes, 1847

= Indian oil sardine =

Species of fish

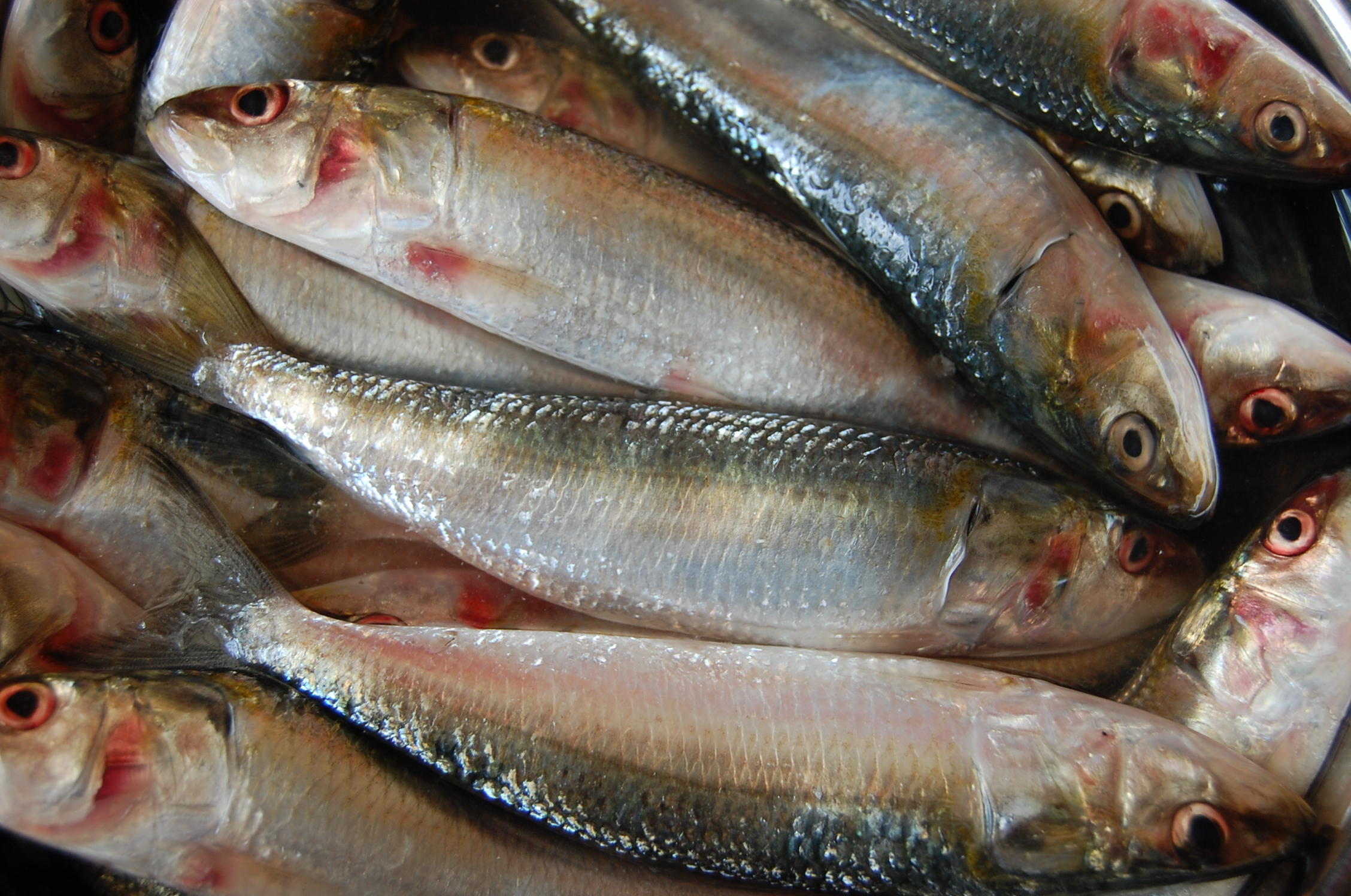
Indian oil sardine

Global capture production of Indian oil sardine (Sardinella longiceps) in thousand tonnes from 1950 to 2022, as reported by the FAO

The Indian oil sardine (Sardinella longiceps) is a species of ray-finned fish in the genus Sardinella. It is one of the two most important commercial fishes in India (with the mackerel). The Indian oil sardine is one of the more regionally limited species of Sardinella and can be found in the northern regions of the Indian Ocean. These fish feed on phytoplankton (diatoms) and zooplankton (copepods).

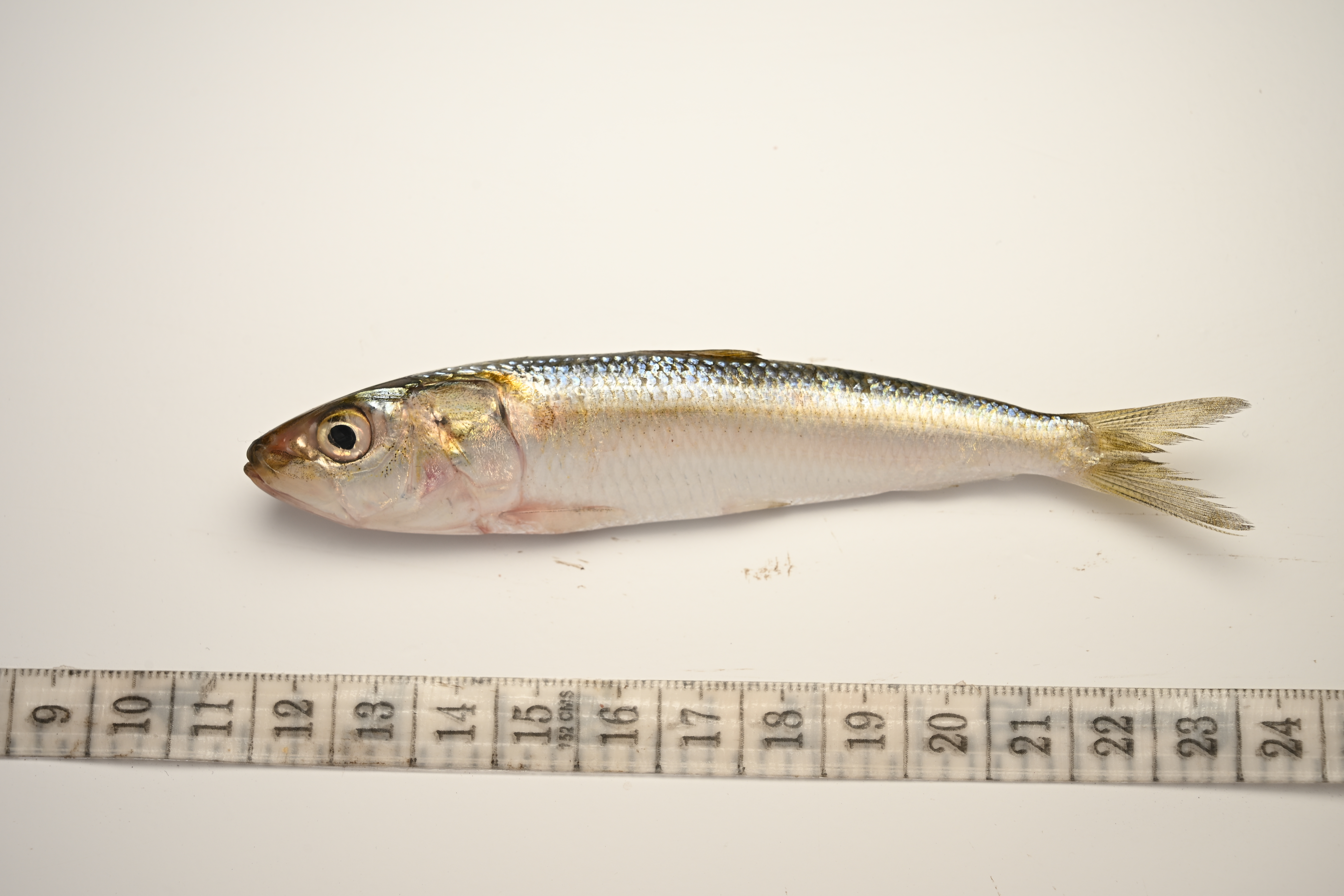
Sardinella longiceps

== Diagnostic features ==
The body of these Sardinella is particularly elongated even to the point of being subcylindrical. They have a slightly rounded belly and have eight rays on their pelvic fins. They have a very large number of gill rakers and a faint golden spot behind the gill opening. They also have a faint golden midlateral line, as well as a black spot on the hind border of their gill covers.

== Growth and development ==
S. longiceps attains sexual maturity around 15 cm and 1 year of age. The lifespan of this fish is about 2.5 years, but difficult to determine because the annual rings in their scales may be formed for several reasons other than yearly changes in their environment. Only after the first year are the rings a reliable indicator of age, because they may be formed due to the reduced feeding activity associated with planktonic scarcity during the rise in temperature of the environment in summer. An experiment was done by measuring scales from a selected body area, and then determining the relationship between the fish length and scale length. According to these tests, the average lengths for each ring were 14.3, 16.4, and 18.4 cm at the age of one, two, and three years, respectively.

== Reproduction ==
The movement of the fish was determined to be less seasonal than dependent on water conditions directly before and after the monsoon season. This affects the spawning season and means that it may vary from any period between June and December. These fish only spawn once during the spawning season. The distribution of the fish throughout the spawning season is determined by the size and age of the fish. Many of the oldest, most mature adults between 17 and 19 cm spawn early in the season, while the juveniles of S. longiceps arrive to spawn later in the season. The peak period for commercial catch is June and July, when the juvenile fish have fattened themselves to prepare for their first spawning season. Rarely does S. longiceps survive a second spawn, but this is much more common in females.

Ovary development is classified in stages I-VI. Stages IV, V, and VI are able to spawn. Fish at stage IV have ovaries that fill two-thirds of their available body cavity. By stage VI, these ovaries fill the body cavity and are made up of large transparent ripe eggs. These fish only spawn once in a spawning season and produce around 75,000 eggs. The development of the egg requires only 24 hours. These eggs are spherical and range from 1 to 4 mm in diameter. These fish are called oil sardines because an oil globule makes up a major part of the egg yolk. These fish have 53 myotomes in the larval stage, but adults have only 46-48 vertebrae.

The first day of development includes minimal movement, but it travels by serpentine swimming. By the end of this first day, the oil globule in the yolk disappears or is used up. On the second day of development, the pigmentation of the larva is stable and the eye coloration stabilizes to a silvery white sheen. During the third day, the yolk is completely used up.
