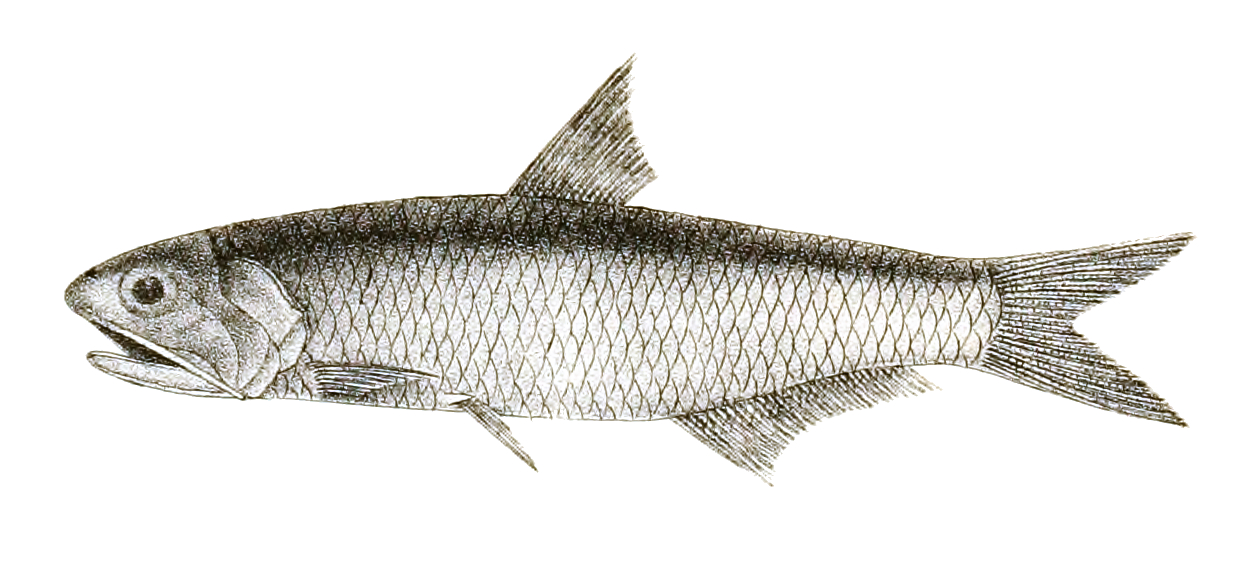
- Thrissina baelama

Scientific classification
- Kingdom: Animalia
- Phylum: Chordata
- Class: Actinopterygii
- Division: Teleostei
- Order: Clupeiformes
- Family: Engraulidae
- Genus: Thrissina; D.S. Jordan & Seale, 1925

= Thrissina =

Genus of ray-finned fishes

Thrissina is a genus of anchovies in the family Engraulidae. Some authorities regard this genus as invalid, and classify the species as part of Thryssa. FishBase considers 13 species as valid (those shown with common names in the following species list).

== Species ==
- Thrissina aurora Hata, Lavoué, Chungthanawong & Motomura, 2023
- Thrissina baelama (Fabricius, 1775) (Baelama anchovy)
- Thrissina belvedere Hata, Quan, Ha & Motomura, 2020 (Ha Long thryssa)
- Thrissina chefuensis (Günther, 1874) (Chefoo thryssa)
- Thrissina cultella Hata & Motomura, 2019 (cutlass thryssa)
- Thrissina evermanni (Jordan & Seale, 1906) (Evermann’s baelama anchovy)
- Thrissina katana Hata, Lavoué & Motomura, 2022
- Thrissina mystica Hata, Lavoué & Motomura in Hata, Lavoué, Psomadakis, Osmany & Motomura, 2025 (Mystique thryssa)
- Thrissina polynemoides (Günther, 1868) (African baelama anchovy)
- Thrissina samam (Montrouzier, 1857) (Samam baelama anchovy)
- Thrissina serena Hata & Motomura, 2019 (Arabian thryssa)
- Thrissina splendida Hata, 2022
- Thrissina supra Hata, Psomadakis, Osmany & Motomura, 2021 (Pakistan thryssa)
- Thrissina tuberculosa (Lacepède, 1803) (Mauritian baelama anchovy)
- Thrissina vitrirostris (Gilchrist & W. W. Thompson, 1908) (Orangemouth anchovy)
- Thrissina whiteheadi (Wongratana, 1983) (Whitehead's thryssa)
