= Iniistius jacksonensis =

Conservation status
- Least Concern (IUCN 3.1)

Scientific classification
- Kingdom: Animalia
- Phylum: Chordata
- Class: Actinopterygii
- Order: Labriformes
- Family: Labridae
- Genus: Iniistius
- Species: I. jacksonensis

Binomial name
- Iniistius jacksonensis (E. P. Ramsay, 1881)

Synonyms
- Novacula jacksonensis Ramsay, 1881; Xyrichtys jacksonensis (Ramsay, 1881)

Species of fish

Iniistius jacksonensis, the purple-spotted wrasse, is a species of marine ray-finned fish in the wrasse family Labridae. It is found in the eastern Indian Ocean.

== Description ==
This species reaches a length of 17.5 cm (6.9 in).
