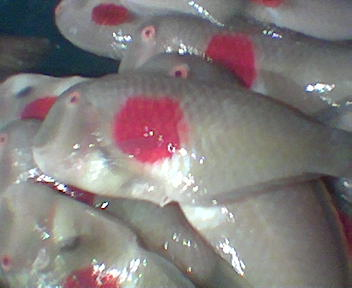
- Redblotch razorfish (I. twistii)
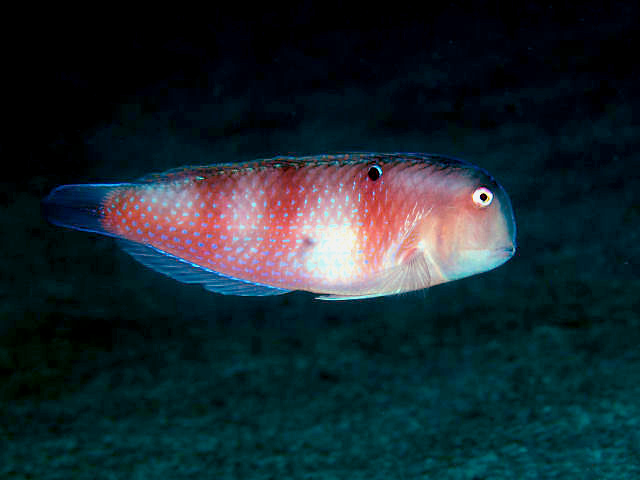
- Blackspot razorfish (I. dea)

Scientific classification
- Kingdom: Animalia
- Phylum: Chordata
- Class: Actinopterygii
- Order: Labriformes
- Family: Labridae
- Subfamily: Xyrichtyinae
- Genus: Iniistius; T. N. Gill, 1862

Type species
- Xyrichthys pavo Valenciennes, 1840

Synonyms
- Duohemipteronotus Fowler, 1956

= Iniistius =

Genus of fishes

Iniistius is a genus of wrasses native to the Indian and Pacific Oceans.

== Species ==
The 22 currently recognized species in this genus are:

- Iniistius aneitensis (Günther, 1862) (yellowblotch razorfish)
- Iniistius auropunctatus J. E. Randall, Earle & D. R. Robertson, 2002
- Iniistius bakunawa (Sorgon, Tea, Meren & Nañola, 2023) (Note: Specimens discovered in the Loay Public Market, Loay, Bohol, Philippines since September 2023.) (Eclipse-spot razor wrasse)
- Iniistius baldwini (D. S. Jordan & Evermann, 1903) (Baldwin's razorfish)
- Iniistius bimaculatus (Rüppell, 1829) (two-spot razorfish)
- Iniistius brevipinnis J. E. Randall, 2013
- Iniistius celebicus (Bleeker, 1856) (Celebes razorfish)
- Iniistius cyanifrons (Valenciennes, 1840)
- Iniistius dea (Temminck & Schlegel, 1845) (blackspot razorfish)
- Iniistius evides (D. S. Jordan & R. E. Richardson, 1909)
- Iniistius geisha (Araga & Yoshino, 1986)
- Iniistius griffithsi J. E. Randall, 2007 (Griffiths' razorfish)
- Iniistius jacksonensis (E. P. Ramsay, 1881) (purple-spotted wrasse)
- Iniistius melanopus (Bleeker, 1857) (yellowpatch razorfish)
- Iniistius naevus G. R. Allen & Erdmann, 2012 (blemished razorfish)
- Iniistius pavo (Valenciennes, 1840) (peacock wrasse)
- Iniistius pentadactylus (Linnaeus, 1758) (fivefinger wrasse)
- Iniistius spilonotus (Bleeker, 1857)
- Iniistius trivittatus (J. E. Randall & Cornish, 2000)
- Iniistius twistii (Bleeker, 1856) (redblotch razorfish)(Japanese flag fish)
- Iniistius umbrilatus (O. P. Jenkins, 1901) (razor wrasse)
- Iniistius verrens (D. S. Jordan & Evermann, 1902)
