= Thryssa marasriae =

Marasri's thryssa

Conservation status
- Least Concern (IUCN 3.1)

Scientific classification
- Kingdom: Animalia
- Phylum: Chordata
- Class: Actinopterygii
- Order: Clupeiformes
- Family: Engraulidae
- Genus: Thryssa
- Species: T. marasriae

Binomial name
- Thryssa marasriae Wongratana, 1983

Species of fish

Thryssa marasriae, the Marasri's thryssa, is a species of ray-finned fish in the family Engraulidae. It is found in the western-central Pacific Ocean.

== Size ==
This species reaches a length of 6.9 cm (2.7 in).

== Etymology ==
The fish is named in honor of the author's wife Marasri Ladpli, for her "patient sharing of my study of fishes, her encouragement, and her tolerance of my trips away from home".
