= Thryssa adelae =

Swatow thryssa

Conservation status
- Data Deficient (IUCN 3.1)

Scientific classification
- Kingdom: Animalia
- Phylum: Chordata
- Class: Actinopterygii
- Order: Clupeiformes
- Family: Engraulidae
- Genus: Thryssa
- Species: T. adelae

Binomial name
- Thryssa adelae (Rutter, 1897)

Synonyms
- Trichosoma adelae Rutter, 1897; Setipinna adelae (Rutter, 1897)

Species of fish

Thryssa adelae, the Swatow thryssa, is a species of ray-finned fish in the family Engraulidae. It is found in the north-western Pacific Ocean.

== Size ==
This species reaches a length of 13.6 cm (5.4 in).

== Etymology ==
The fish is named in honor of American Baptist missionary Adele M. Fielde (1839–1916), who sent a collection of fishes from the port of Swatow, China, including the type specimen of this fish, to the University of Indiana in 1885.
