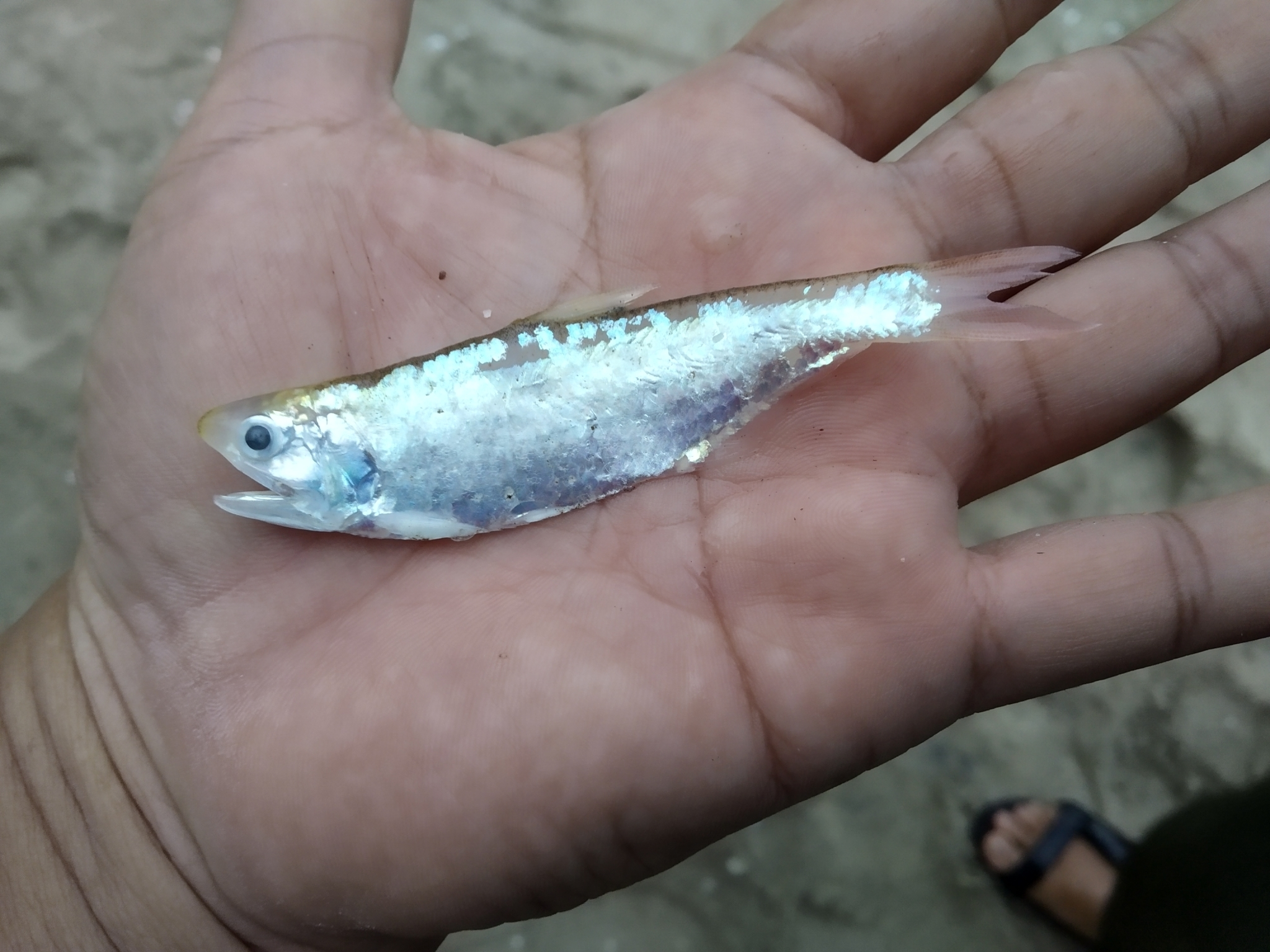

Conservation status
- Data Deficient (IUCN 3.1)

Scientific classification
- Kingdom: Animalia
- Phylum: Chordata
- Class: Actinopterygii
- Order: Clupeiformes
- Family: Engraulidae
- Genus: Thryssa
- Species: T. kammalensis

Binomial name
- Thryssa kammalensis (Bleeker, 1849)

Synonyms
- Engraulis kammalensis Bleeker, 1849; Scutengraulis kammalensis (Bleeker, 1849); Thrissa kammalensis (Bleeker, 1849); Thrissocles kammalensis (Bleeker, 1849); Thryssa kammanensis (Bleeker, 1849); Engraulis rhinorhynchos Bleeker, 1852

= Thryssa kammalensis =

Kammal thryssa

Species of fish

Thryssa kammalensis, the Kammal thryssa, is a species of ray-finned fish in the family Engraulidae. It is found in the western Indo Pacific.

== Size ==
This species reaches a length of 18.0 cm (7.1 in).

== Etymology ==
The fish is named in honor of a place: Kammal in Java, Indonesia, the locality where the type specimen was found.
