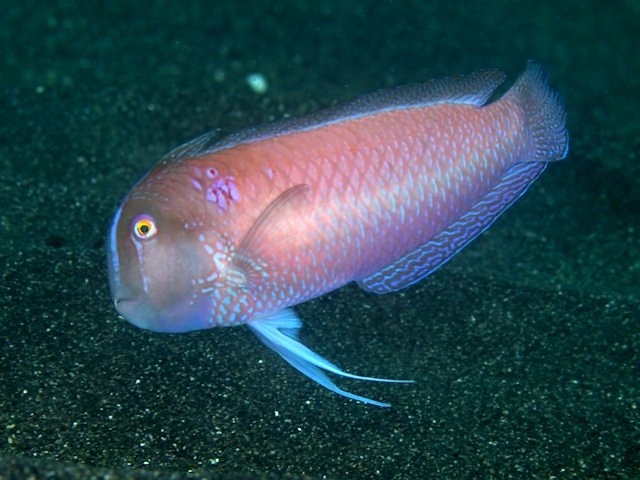

Conservation status
- Least Concern (IUCN 3.1)

Scientific classification
- Kingdom: Animalia
- Phylum: Chordata
- Class: Actinopterygii
- Order: Labriformes
- Family: Labridae
- Genus: Iniistius
- Species: I. verrens

Binomial name
- Iniistius verrens (D. S. Jordan & Evermann, 1902)

Synonyms
- Hemipteronotus verrens Jordan & Evermann, 1902; Xyrichtys verrens (Jordan & Evermann, 1902); Hemipteronotus caeruleopunctatus Yu, 1968

= Iniistius verrens =

Species of fish

Iniistius verrens, the three banded razorfish or blue razor wrasse, is a species of marine ray-finned fish in the family Labridae, the wrasses. It is found in the north-western Pacific Ocean, including Japan and Taiwan.
