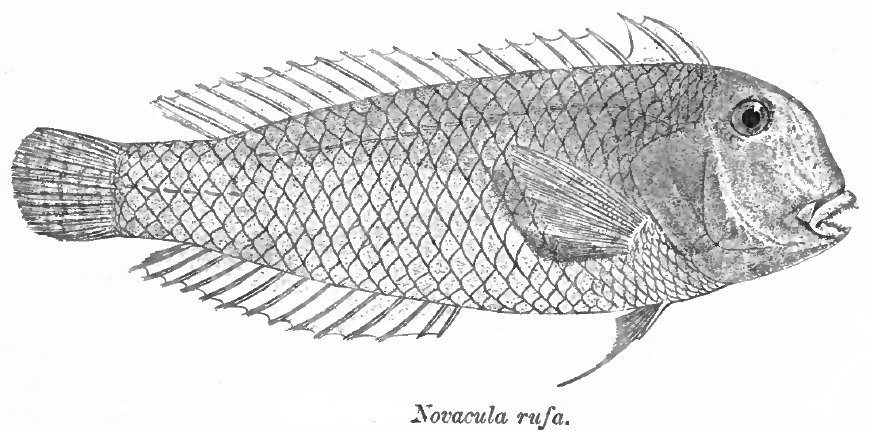

Conservation status
- Data Deficient (IUCN 3.1)

Scientific classification
- Kingdom: Animalia
- Phylum: Chordata
- Class: Actinopterygii
- Order: Labriformes
- Family: Labridae
- Genus: Iniistius
- Species: I. cyanifrons

Binomial name
- Iniistius cyanifrons (Valenciennes, 1840)

Synonyms
- Xyrichthys cyanifrons Valenciennes, 1840

= Iniistius cyanifrons =

Species of fish

Iniistius cyanifrons is a species of marine ray-finned fish from the family Labridae, the wrasses, currently only known from the Indian Ocean.

== Description ==
This species reaches a length of 14.9 cm (5.9 in).
