= Thryssa aestuaria =

Estuarine thryssa

Conservation status
- Least Concern (IUCN 3.1)

Scientific classification
- Kingdom: Animalia
- Phylum: Chordata
- Class: Actinopterygii
- Order: Clupeiformes
- Family: Engraulidae
- Genus: Thryssa
- Species: T. aestuaria

Binomial name
- Thryssa aestuaria (J. D. Ogilby, 1910)

Synonyms
- Anchovia aestuaria Ogilby, 1910; Thrissina aestuaria (Ogilby, 1910); Thryssa nasuta (Castelnau, 1878)

Species of fish

Thryssa aestuaria, the estuarine thryssa, is a species of ray-finned fish in the family Engraulidae. It is found in the western Pacific Ocean.

== Size ==
This species reaches a length of 13.8 cm (5.4 in).
