= Adele M. Fielde =

American social activist, missionary, scientist, writer

Adele Marion Fielde
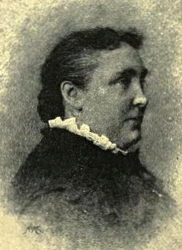
- Born: Adelia Field; March 30, 1839; East Rodman, New York
- Died: February 23, 1916 (aged 76); King County, Washington
- Known for: The Fielde Nest
- Parent(s): Leighton Field and Sophia (Tiffany) Field

Adele Marion Fielde (March 30, 1839 – February 23, 1916) was a Baptist missionary, a social activist, scientist, and humanitarian.

== Biography ==
Adelia Field was born in East Rodman, New York on March 30, 1839. Her parents were Leighton Field and Sophia (Tiffany) Field. At age sixteen she started using the pen name Adele M. Fielde, and was later baptized and registered under that name. She graduated from New York State Normal School in Albany in 1860. From 1883 to 1885, she studied medicine at the Medical College of Pennsylvania. Fielde also studied biology for two years at the Philadelphia Academy of Natural Sciences, but did not receive a formal degree.

At age 27, her fiancé, Reverend Cyrus A. Chilcott (Chinese: 周谷), went to Thailand to engage in missionary work among the local Chinese, and she followed, only to find he had passed several weeks before her arrival in July 1886. She never married. Fielde stayed on as a missionary in Bangkok until 1872. From February 1873 to 1889, she was a missionary in the Chinese port city of Swatow, except for a break of two years from 1883 to 1885 in the United States. While in Swatow, Fielde preached not in English but Teochew dialect and did not teach the "domestic-skills" curriculum common in women's mission schools. Instead, Fielde promoted education she felt was suited to each convert, as well as campaigning against foot-binding, slavery, and repressive marriages. Field's later career has led to the assumption that she left her religious beliefs behind, while some scholars view her work as an extension of her faith.

In 1894, after the defeat of the women's suffrage amendment to the New York State constitution, Fielde was one of six prominent suffragists who founded the League for Political Education. She worked with other suffragists to establish the Volunteer Committee with the goal of targeting New York society, using her wealth and status she established as a missionary in China to facilitate her efforts.

== Key research contributions ==
Fielde made significant contributions to myrmecology, the study of ants. In particular, she devised the 'Fielde Nest', a portable observation nest that she then used to enable precise observations of ant behaviour, and which was also used by others including William Morton Wheeler. She published over 20 papers about ants in less than 10 years. She carried out her myrmecological research at Woods Hole, Massachusetts, one of the few institutions that was sympathetic to female students at that time. In addition to studying there, she also gave lectures. Key discoveries include demonstrating that ants use their antennae to recognise nestmates and that ants react to vibrations in the ground detected via their legs, rather than 'hearing' sound travelling through the air. This latter finding was determined by playing sounds to various ant species with a range of musical instruments; Fielde was not only the first to show that ants are sensitive to substrate-bourne vibrations but also demonstrated that there are species-level differences in which frequencies the ants respond to.

Fielde also wrote a comprehensive dictionary and guide to the Chinese Swatow dialect, and was known to locals as "Miss Fielde" (Chinese: 斐姑娘).

== Selected works ==
- Fielde, Adele M. (1894). A corner of Cathay: studies from life among the Chinese. New York: Macmillan and Co.
- Pagoda shadows: studies from life in China (3rd ed.). Boston: W.G. Corthell. 1885.
- Fielde, Adele M. (1914). Parliamentary procedure; a compendium of its rules compiled from the latest and highest authorities, for the use of students and for the guidance of officers and members of clubs, societies, boards, committees, and all deliberative bodies. Seattle, WA: Helen N. Stevens.
- Fielde, Adele M. (1883). A pronouncing and defining dictionary of the Swatow dialect, arranged according to syllables and tones. Shanghai: American Presbyterian Mission Press.
- Fielde, Adele M. (1878). First Lessons in the Swatow Dialect. Swatow: Swatow Printing Office Company.
- Fielde, Adele M. (1900). "Portable Ant Nests". Biological Bulletin. 2 (4): 81–85. doi:10.2307/1535796. JSTOR 1535796.
- Fielde, Adele M.; Parker, George H. (1904). "The reactions of ants to material vibrations". Proceedings of the Academy of Natural Sciences of Philadelphia. 56 (3): 642–649. JSTOR 4062955.

== Taxon named in her honor ==
- The Swatow thryssa, Thryssa adelae, is a species of ray-finned fish in the family Engraulidae. It is found in the Northwest Pacific Ocean.
