= Thryssa spinidens =

Bengal thryssa

Conservation status
- Data Deficient (IUCN 3.1)

Scientific classification
- Kingdom: Animalia
- Phylum: Chordata
- Class: Actinopterygii
- Order: Clupeiformes
- Family: Engraulidae
- Genus: Thryssa
- Species: T. spinidens

Binomial name
- Thryssa spinidens (D. S. Jordan & Seale, 1925)

Synonyms
- Xenengraulis spinidens Jordan & Seale, 1925

Species of fish

Thryssa spinidens, the Bengal thryssa, is a species of ray-finned fish in the family Engraulidae. It is found in the eastern Indian Ocean.

== Size ==
This species reaches a length of 16.5 cm (6.5 in).
