= Iniistius brevipinnis =

Scientific classification
- Kingdom: Animalia
- Phylum: Chordata
- Class: Actinopterygii
- Order: Labriformes
- Family: Labridae
- Genus: Iniistius
- Species: I. brevipinnis

Binomial name
- Iniistius brevipinnis J. E. Randall, 2013

Species of fish

Iniistius brevipinnis is a species of marine ray-finned fish in the family Labridae, the wrasses. It is found in the western Indian Ocean.

== Description ==
This species reaches a length of 14.3 cm (5.6 in).
