= Thryssa chefuensis =

Chefoo thryssa

Conservation status
- Data Deficient (IUCN 3.1)

Scientific classification
- Kingdom: Animalia
- Phylum: Chordata
- Class: Actinopterygii
- Order: Clupeiformes
- Family: Engraulidae
- Genus: Thryssa
- Species: T. chefuensis

Binomial name
- Thryssa chefuensis (Günther, 1874)

Synonyms
- Engraulis chefuensis Günther, 1874

Species of fish

Thryssa chefuensis, the Chefoo thryssa, is a species of ray-finned fish in the family Engraulidae. It is found in the western Pacific Ocean.

== Size ==
This species reaches a length of 10.7 cm (4.2 in).
