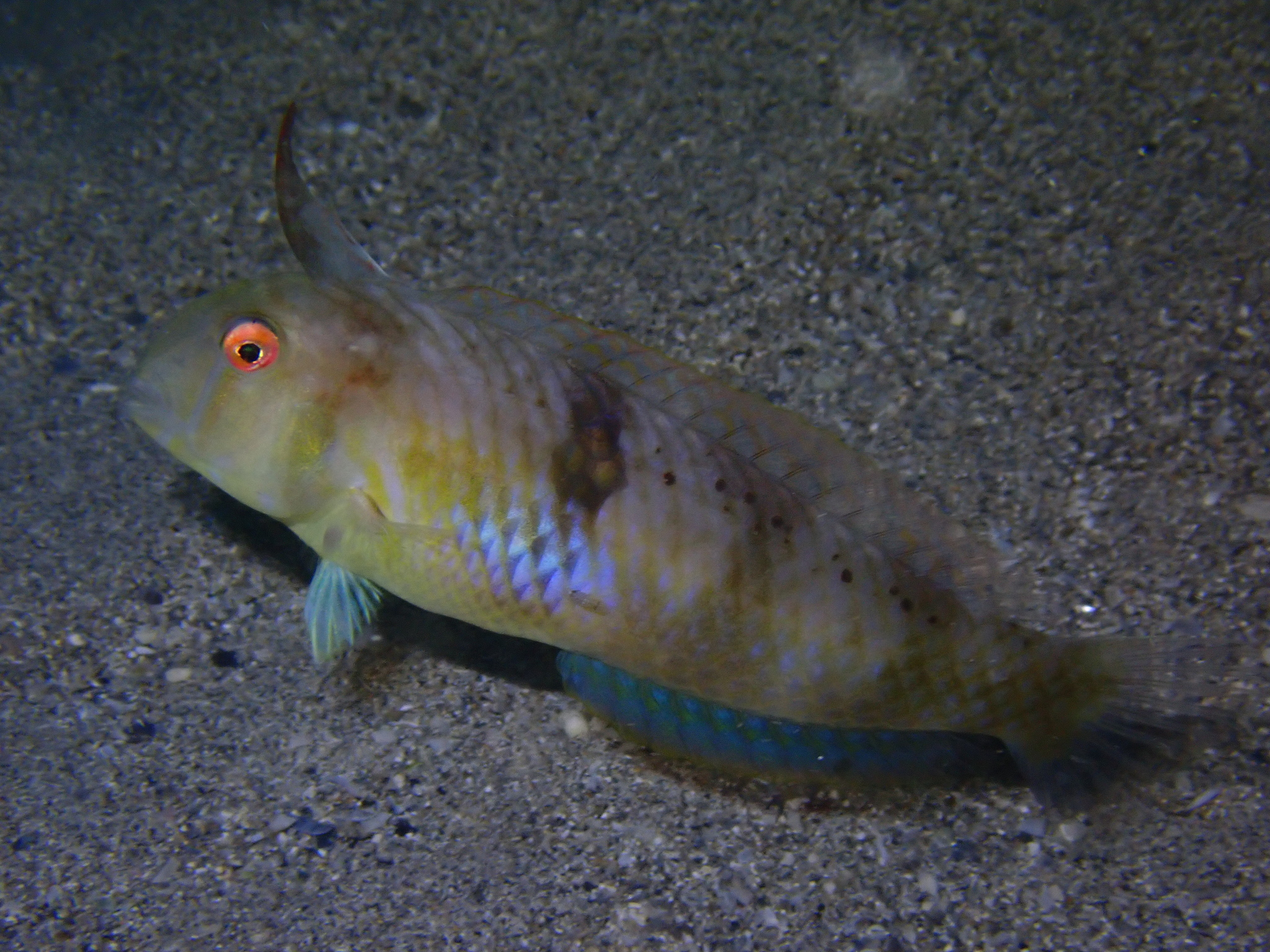

Scientific classification
- Kingdom: Animalia
- Phylum: Chordata
- Class: Actinopterygii
- Order: Labriformes
- Family: Labridae
- Genus: Iniistius
- Species: I. naevus

Binomial name
- Iniistius naevus G. R. Allen & Erdmann, 2012

= Iniistius naevus =

Species of fish

Iniistius naevus, the blemished razorfish, is a species of marine ray-finned fish from the family Labridae, the wrasses. It is found in the eastern Indian Ocean.

== Description ==
This species reaches a length of 13.2 cm (5.2 in).
