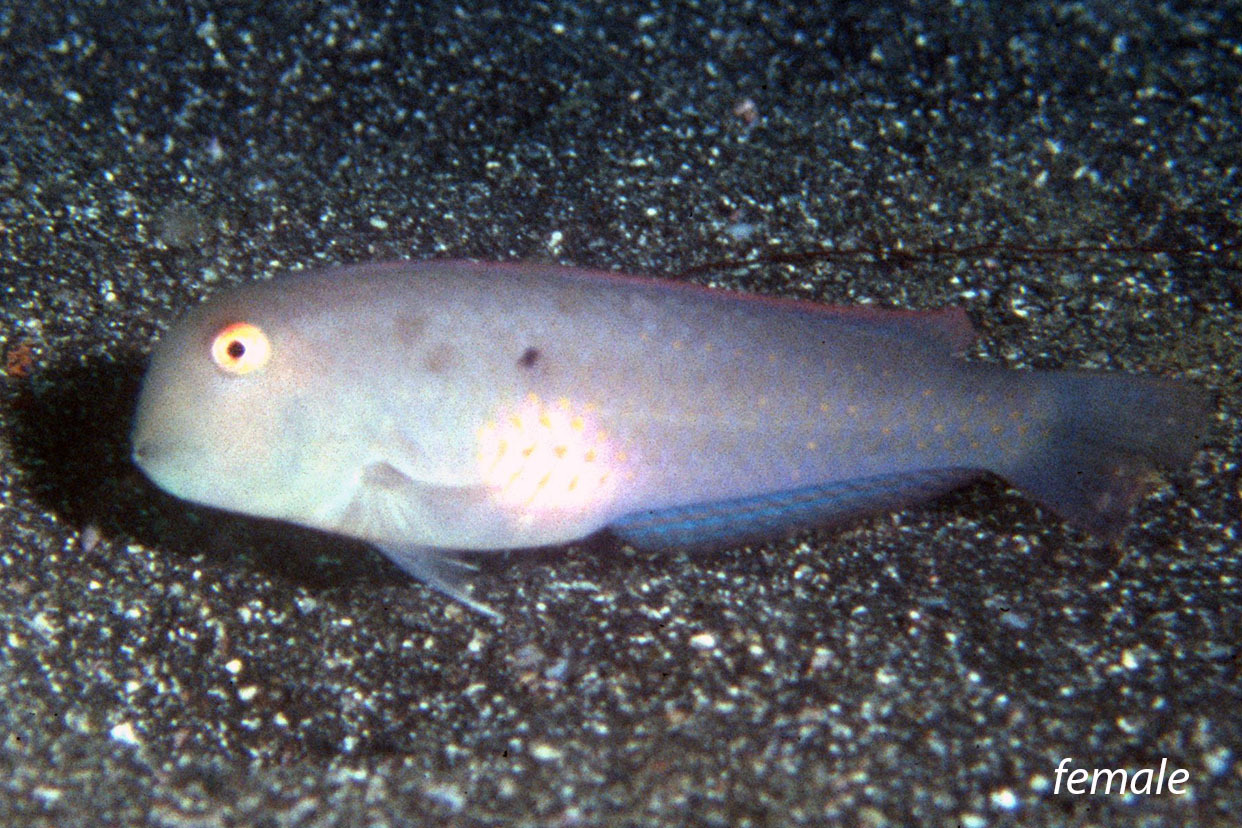

Conservation status
- Least Concern (IUCN 3.1)

Scientific classification
- Kingdom: Animalia
- Phylum: Chordata
- Class: Actinopterygii
- Order: Labriformes
- Family: Labridae
- Genus: Iniistius
- Species: I. auropunctatus

Binomial name
- Iniistius auropunctatus J. E. Randall, Earle & D. R. Robertson, 2002

= Iniistius auropunctatus =

Species of fish

Iniistius auropunctatus is a species of marine ray-finned fish from the family Labridae, the wrasses. It is found in the eastern-central Pacific Ocean.

== Description ==
This species reaches a length of 12.9 cm (5.1 in).
