= Thryssa brevicauda =

Short-tail thryssa

Conservation status
- Least Concern (IUCN 3.1)

Scientific classification
- Kingdom: Animalia
- Phylum: Chordata
- Class: Actinopterygii
- Order: Clupeiformes
- Family: Engraulidae
- Genus: Thryssa
- Species: T. brevicauda

Binomial name
- Thryssa brevicauda T. R. Roberts, 1978

Species of fish

Thryssa brevicauda, the short-tail thryssa, is a species of ray-finned fish in the family Engraulidae. It is found in the western-central Pacific Ocean.

== Size ==
This species reaches a length of 21.5 cm (8.5 in).
