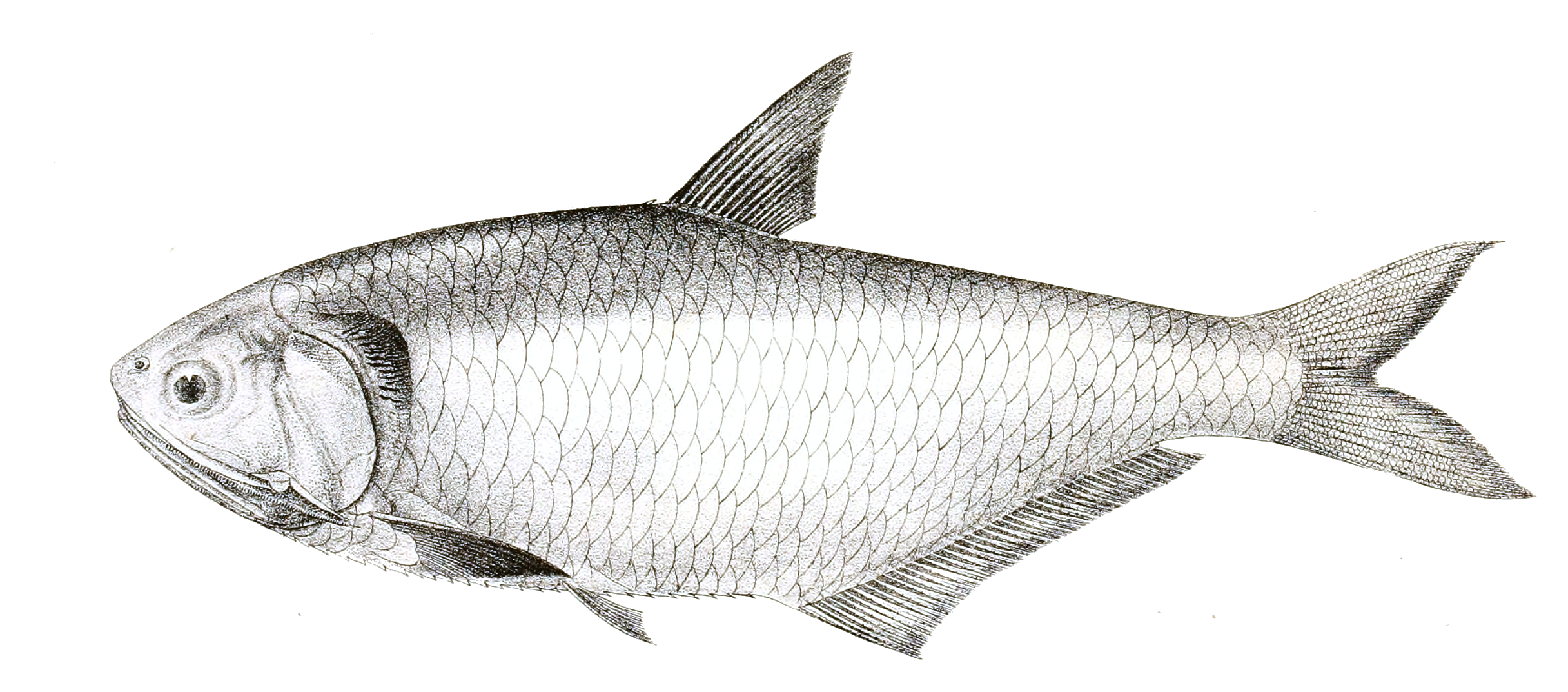

Conservation status
- Data Deficient (IUCN 3.1)

Scientific classification
- Kingdom: Animalia
- Phylum: Chordata
- Class: Actinopterygii
- Order: Clupeiformes
- Family: Engraulidae
- Genus: Thryssa
- Species: T. malabarica

Binomial name
- Thryssa malabarica (Bloch, 1795)

Synonyms
- Clupea malabaricus Bloch, 1795; Clupea malabarica Bloch, 1795; Thrissocles malabaricus (Bloch, 1795); Thryssa cuvieri (Swainson, 1839)

= Thryssa malabarica =

Malabar thryssa

Species of ray-finned fish

Thryssa malabarica, the Gautama thryssa or Malabar anchovy, is a species of amphidromous ray-finned fish in the family Engraulidae. It is known as Balal parattaya බළල් පරට්ටයා in Sinhalese.

== Description ==
It is distributed throughout the Indian Ocean of coast of India, Sri Lanka, and possibly Pakistan. It is a small schooling fish found at a depth of 20–50 m (66–164 ft). Maximum length does not exceed 17.5 cm (6.9 in). The dorsal fin lacks soft rays and there are 34 to 38 soft rays in the anal fin. There are 23 to 26 keeled scutes on the belly. The characteristic feature to identify the fish is the presence of a dark blotch behind upper part of gill opening, and spots on cheeks and paired fins. Gill arches are pinky orange in color.
