= Iniistius evides =

Conservation status
- Least Concern (IUCN 3.1)

Scientific classification
- Kingdom: Animalia
- Phylum: Chordata
- Class: Actinopterygii
- Order: Labriformes
- Family: Labridae
- Genus: Iniistius
- Species: I. evides

Binomial name
- Iniistius evides (D. S. Jordan & R. E. Richardson, 1909)

Synonyms
- Hemipteronotus evides Jordan & Richardson, 1909; Xyrichtys evides (Jordan & Richardson, 1909); Xyrichthys evides (Jordan & Richardson, 1909); Hemipteronotus maculosus Fourmanoir, 1967

Species of fish

Iniistius evides is a species of marine ray-finned fish from the wrasse family Labridae. It is found in the western Pacific Ocean.

== Description ==
This species reaches a length of 19.0 cm (7.5 in).
