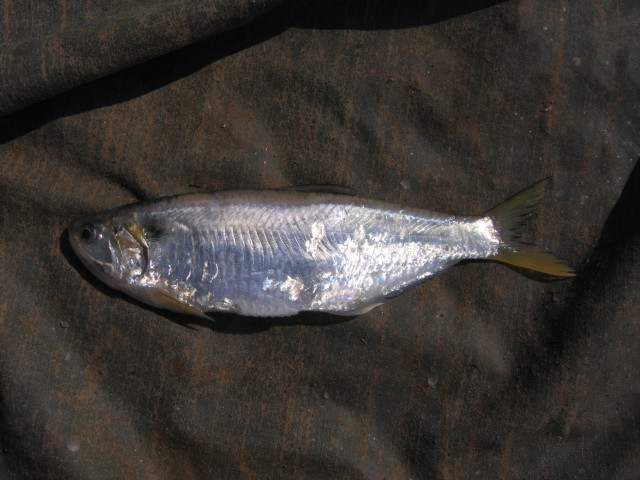

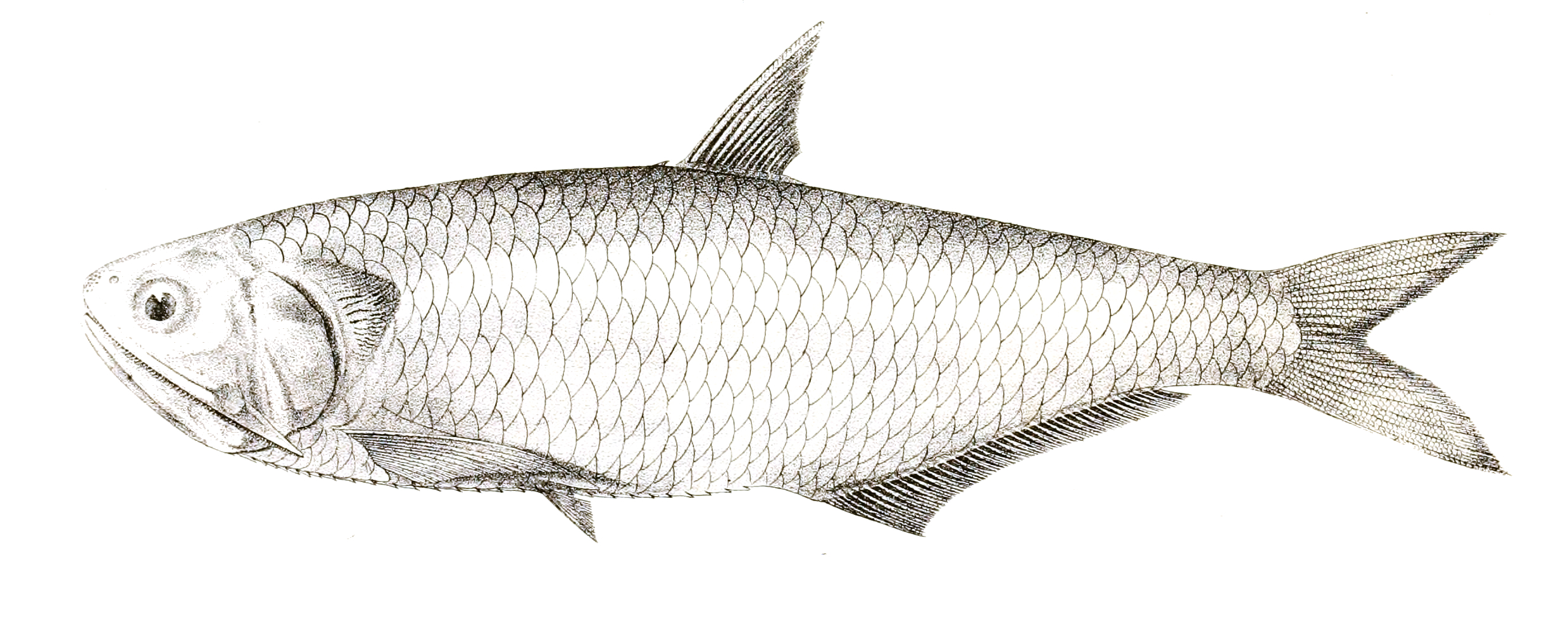
- Thryssa hamiltonii

Conservation status
- Least Concern (IUCN 3.1)

Scientific classification
- Kingdom: Animalia
- Phylum: Chordata
- Class: Actinopterygii
- Order: Clupeiformes
- Family: Engraulidae
- Genus: Thryssa
- Species: T. hamiltonii

Binomial name
- Thryssa hamiltonii Gray, 1835

= Thryssa hamiltonii =

Hamilton's thryssa

Species of ray-finned fish

Thryssa hamiltonii, or Hamilton's thryssa, is a species of ray-finned fish in the family Engraulidae. The species is found in the tropical western Indo-Pacific region: mainly, the eastern direction near Myanmar, Taiwan, the northern head of Australia and Papua New Guinea and possibly the Philippines.

== Etymology ==
Although the patronym was not identified by Gray, T. hamiltonii was clearly named in honor of Francis Hamilton-Buchanan (1762–1829), Scottish physician and naturalist, who published an influential account of Indo-Gangetic fishes in 1822.
