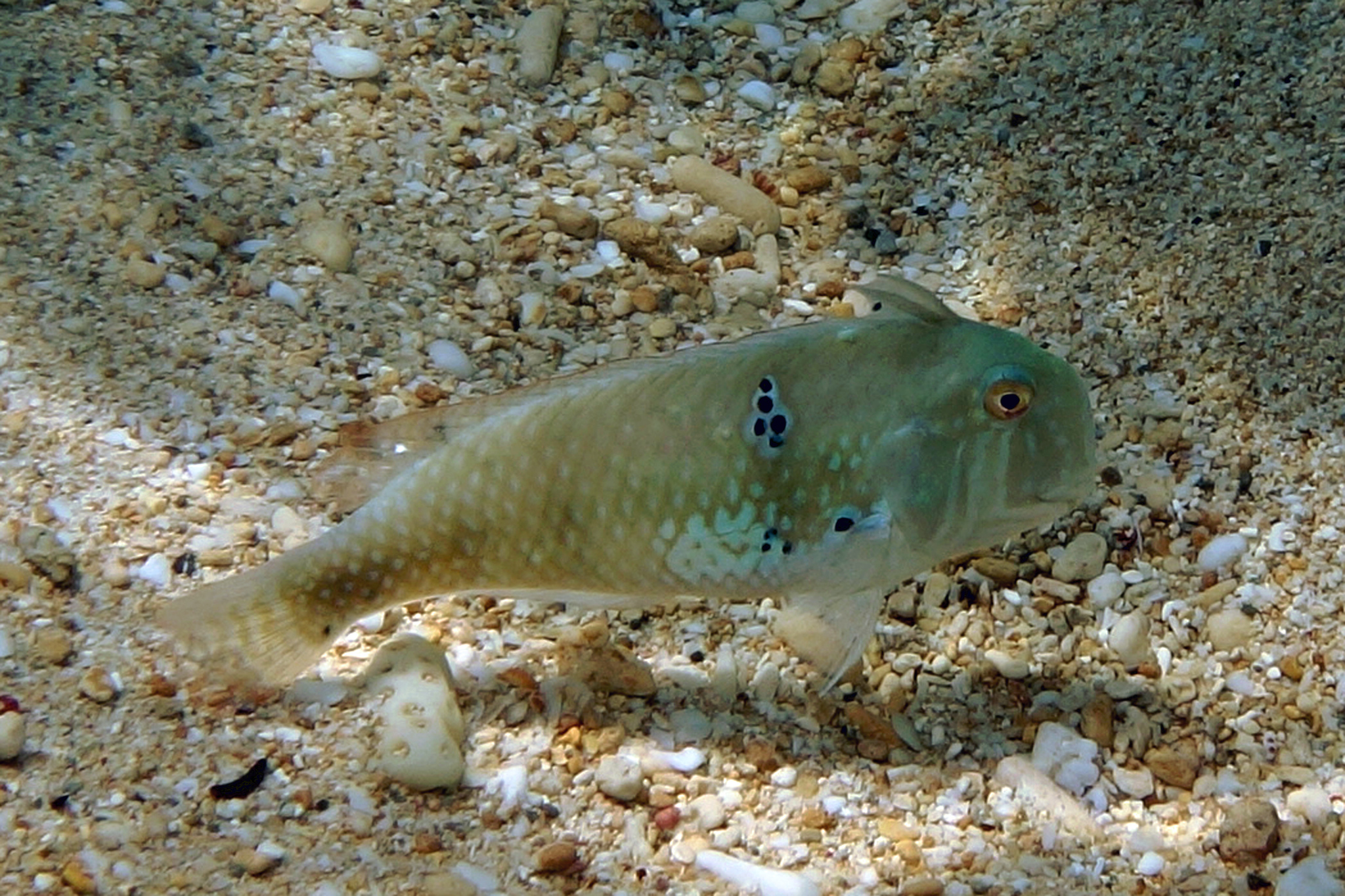

Conservation status
- Least Concern (IUCN 3.1)

Scientific classification
- Kingdom: Animalia
- Phylum: Chordata
- Class: Actinopterygii
- Division: Teleostei
- Order: Labriformes
- Family: Labridae
- Genus: Iniistius
- Species: I. griffithsi

Binomial name
- Iniistius griffithsi J. E. Randall, 2007

= Iniistius griffithsi =

Species of fish

Iniistius griffithsi, also known as Griffiths' razorfish, is a species of marine ray-finned fish in the family Labridae, the wrasses. It is found in the Indian Ocean.

== Description ==
This species reaches a length of 14.3 cm (5.6 in).

== Etymology ==
The fish is named in honor of Jeremy Griffiths, one of the two fishermen who captured the type specimen via handline.
