= Eclipse-spot razor wrasse =

Scientific classification
- Domain: Eukaryota
- Kingdom: Animalia
- Phylum: Chordata
- Class: Actinopterygii
- Order: Labriformes
- Family: Labridae
- Genus: Iniistius
- Species: I. bakunawa

Binomial name
- Iniistius bakunawa Sorgon, Tea, Meren & Nañola 2023

Species of fish

The eclipse-spot razor wrasse (Iniistius bakunawa) is a species of wrasse native to the Indo-Pacific. This fish is in the family Labridae.

== Discovery ==
The species was written from seven specimens obtained from public fish markets from the Philippines, and two specimens from deep channel trawls from Western Australia. This fish was discovered in 2023, but the seven specimens found in the public fish markets were discovered in 2018.

== Appearance ==
The new species is highly distinctive in having a pale jade green body with a large black and white concentric ellipsoid ocellus on the posterior edge of its dorsal fin.

== Naming ==
The species was named Bakunawa, referring to a draconic creature in Visayan mythology that would have caused an eclipse by devouring the moon. The name was given in reference to the eclipse-like mark on the dorsal fin, which resembles a total solar eclipse.
