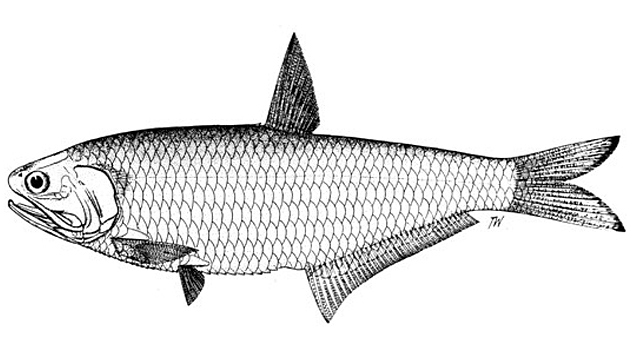

Conservation status
- Data Deficient (IUCN 3.1)

Scientific classification
- Kingdom: Animalia
- Phylum: Chordata
- Class: Actinopterygii
- Order: Clupeiformes
- Family: Engraulidae
- Genus: Thryssa
- Species: T. scratchleyi

Binomial name
- Thryssa scratchleyi (E. P. Ramsay & J. D. Ogilby, 1886)

= Freshwater anchovy =

Species of ray-finned fish

The freshwater anchovy or New Guinea thryssa (Thryssa scratchleyi) is a species of ray-finned fish in the family Engraulidae. It is native to Australia, Indonesia and Papua New Guinea.

== Habitat ==
Thryssa scratchleyi is known to be found in coastal estuaries, rivers and freshwater lagoons, usually well upstream into freshwater and has been found about 900 km (560 mi) inland in the Fly system in Papua New Guinea.

== Human interaction ==
Thryssa scratchleyi is recorded to serve no threats to humans, and it is a harmless species. Due to its large size, it is harvested both as a game fish and as a target of artisanal fishing.

== Size ==
Thryssa scratchleyi is recorded to be the largest anchovy known, reaching a length of 40 cm (1 ft 4 in).
