= Iniistius geisha =

Conservation status
- Data Deficient (IUCN 3.1)

Scientific classification
- Kingdom: Animalia
- Phylum: Chordata
- Class: Actinopterygii
- Order: Labriformes
- Family: Labridae
- Genus: Iniistius
- Species: I. geisha

Binomial name
- Iniistius geisha (Araga & Yoshino, 1986)

Synonyms
- Xyrichtys geisha Araga & Yoshino, 1986

Species of fish

Iniistius geisha is a species of marine ray-finned fish from the family Labridae, the wrasses. It is found in the western-central Pacific Ocean.
