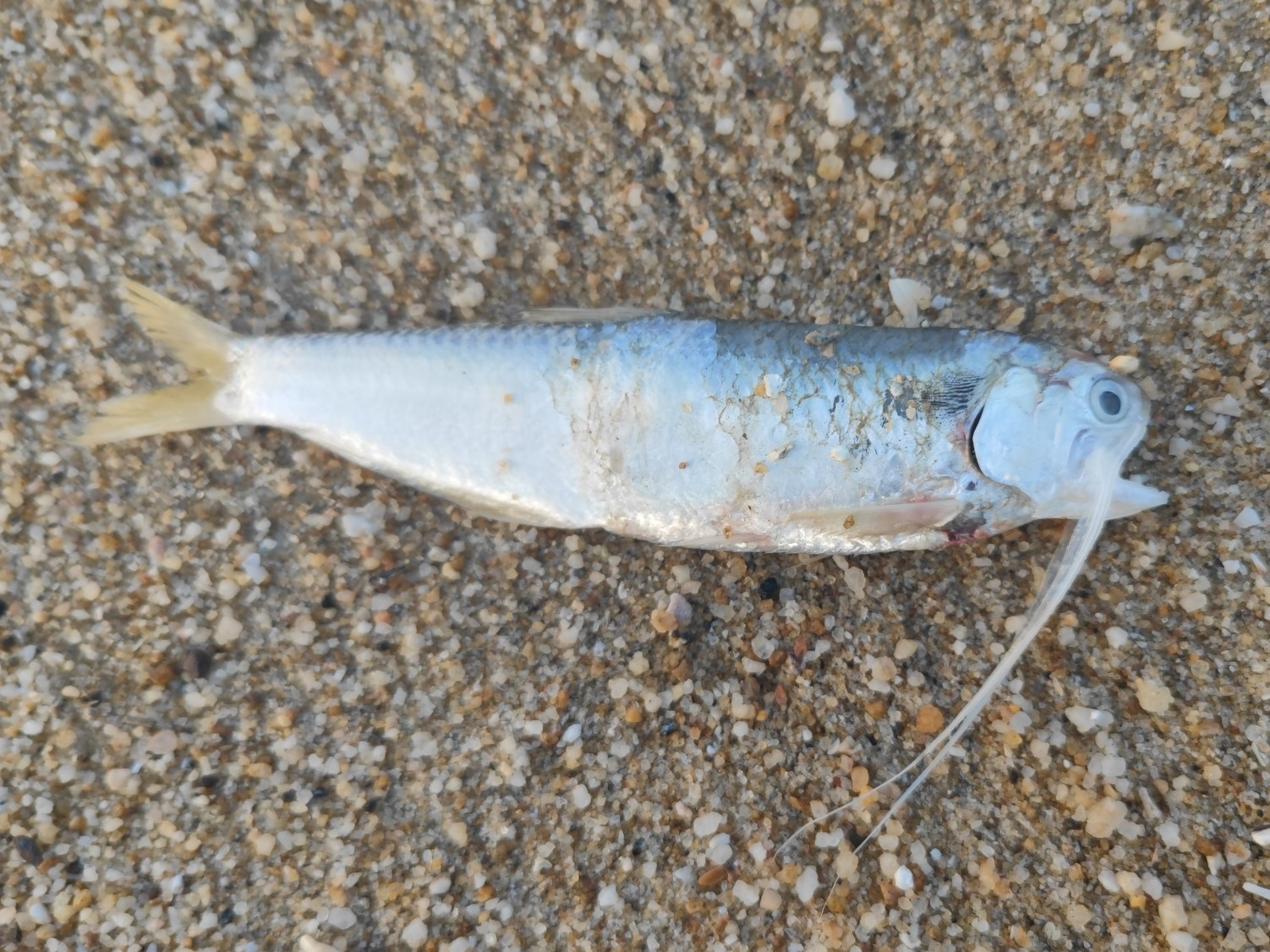

Conservation status
- Least Concern (IUCN 3.1)

Scientific classification
- Kingdom: Animalia
- Phylum: Chordata
- Class: Actinopterygii
- Order: Clupeiformes
- Family: Engraulidae
- Genus: Thryssa
- Species: T. setirostris

Binomial name
- Thryssa setirostris (Broussonet, 1782)

Synonyms
- List: Clupea setirostris Broussonet, 1782; Engraulis setirostris (Broussonet, 1782); Scutengraulis setirostris (Broussonet, 1782); Thrissa setirostris (Broussonet, 1782); Thrissocles setirostris (Broussonet, 1782); Clupea seticornis Broussonet, 1782

= Thryssa setirostris =

Longjaw thryssa

Species of fish

Thryssa setirostris, the longjaw thryssa, is a species of ray-finned fish in the family Engraulidae. It is found in the Indo-Pacific.

== Size ==
This species reaches a length of 18 cm (7.1 in).
