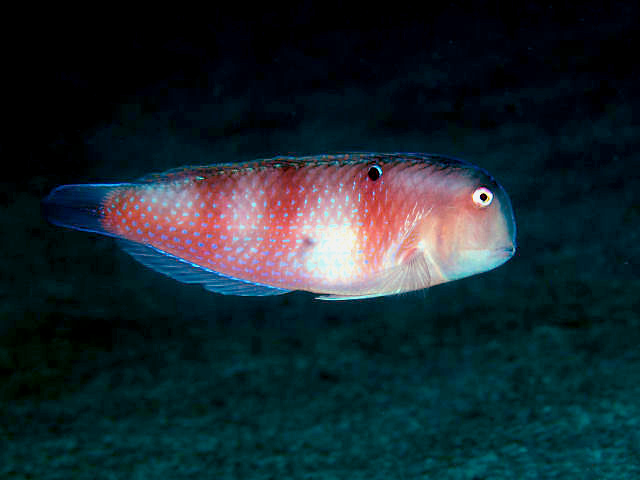

Conservation status
- Least Concern (IUCN 3.1)

Scientific classification
- Kingdom: Animalia
- Phylum: Chordata
- Class: Actinopterygii
- Order: Labriformes
- Family: Labridae
- Genus: Iniistius
- Species: I. dea

Binomial name
- Iniistius dea (Temminck & Schlegel, 1845)

Synonyms
- List: Xirichthys dea Temminck & Schlegel, 1845; Hemipteronotus dea (Temminck & Schlegel, 1845); Xyrichtys dea Temminck & Schlegel, 1845; Xyrichthys margaritatus Fourmanoir, 1967; Xyrichtys margaritatus Fourmanoir, 1967

= Iniistius dea =

Species of fish

Iniistius dea, the blackspot razorfish, is a species of marine ray-finned fish from the family Labridae, the wrasses. It is found in the Indo-West Pacific, from India and north-western Australia to the southern part of Japan and the China seas.

== Description ==
This species reaches a length of 30.00 cm (11.81 in).
