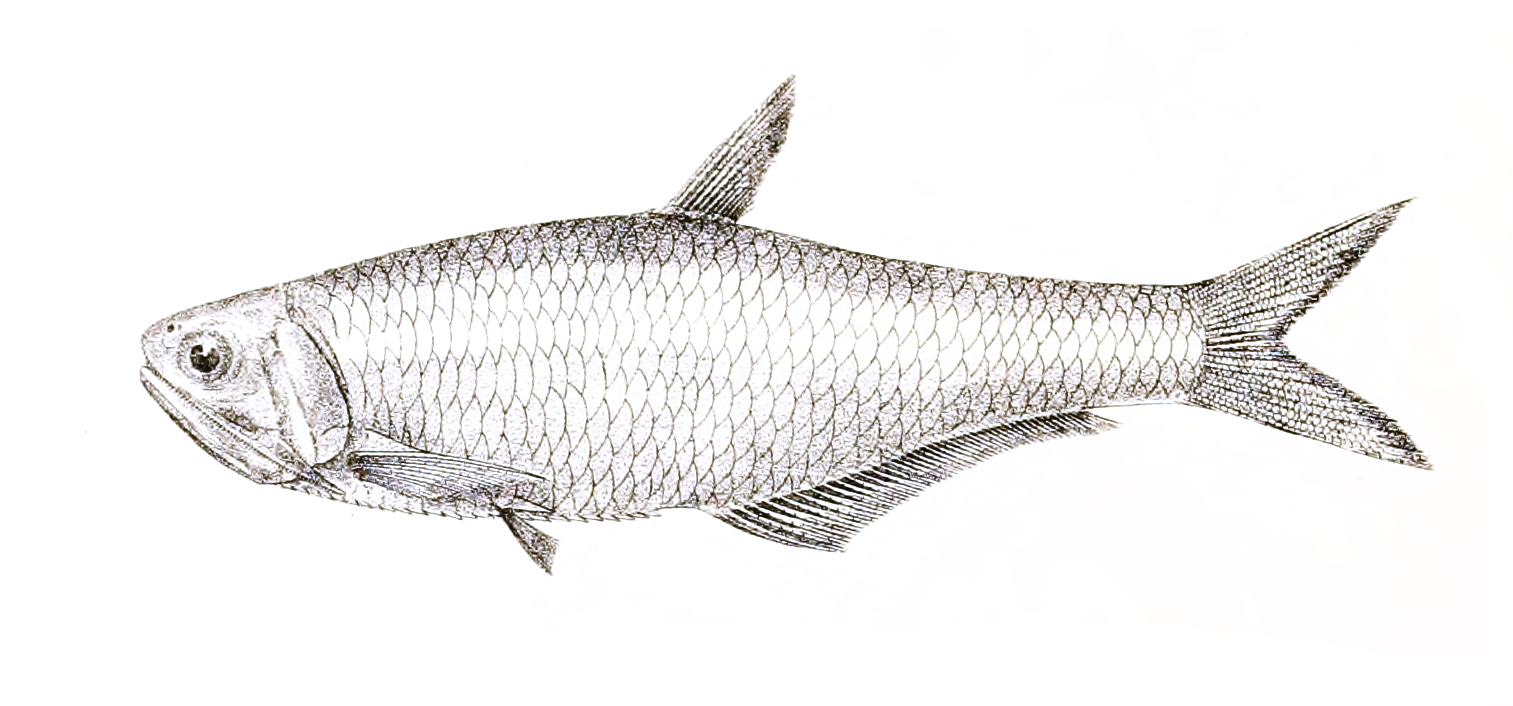

Conservation status
- Data Deficient (IUCN 3.1)

Scientific classification
- Kingdom: Animalia
- Phylum: Chordata
- Class: Actinopterygii
- Order: Clupeiformes
- Family: Engraulidae
- Genus: Thryssa
- Species: T. purava

Binomial name
- Thryssa purava (F. Hamilton, 1822)

Synonyms
- Clupea purava Hamilton, 1822; Engraulis annandalei Chaudhuri, 1916; Engraulis purava (Hamilton, 1822); Thrissa purava (Hamilton, 1822)

= Thryssa purava =

Oblique-jaw thryssa

Species of fish

Thryssa purava, the oblique-jaw thryssa, is a species of ray-finned fish in the family Engraulidae. It is found in the Indian Ocean.

== Size ==
This species reaches a length of 15.5 cm (6.1 in).
