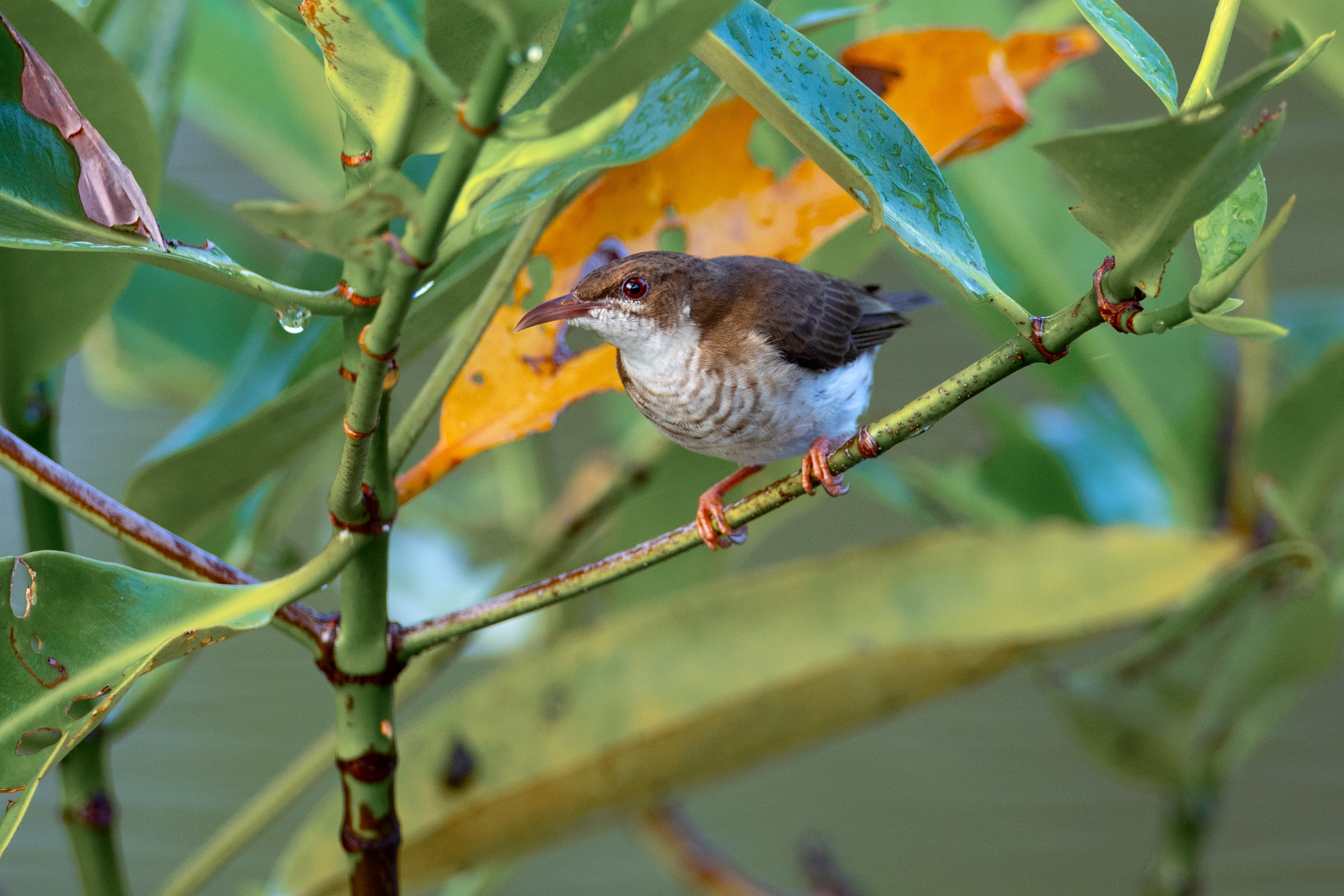
- West Papua, Indonesia

Conservation status
- Least Concern (IUCN 3.1)

Scientific classification
- Kingdom: Animalia
- Phylum: Chordata
- Class: Aves
- Order: Passeriformes
- Family: Meliphagidae
- Genus: Ramsayornis
- Species: R. modestus

Binomial name
- Ramsayornis modestus (Gray, 1858)

= Brown-backed honeyeater =

Species of bird

The brown-backed honeyeater (Ramsayornis modestus) is a species of bird in the family Meliphagidae. It is found in New Guinea and Cape York Peninsula in Queensland, Australia. Its natural habitat is subtropical or tropical mangrove forests.

== Description ==
The Brown-backed honeyeater is small in size, measuring around 11–12cm in length with a weight of 11–14 g. The average wingspan is 6.2–7 cm (2.4 to 2.7 in), and the bill is 1.5–1.8 cm in length. Like the name suggests, it has a brown back with brown streaks across an otherwise white chest and belly, and a red bill. Similar in appearance to the Bar-breasted Honeyeater, but with a differing facial pattern.

=== Calls ===
Calls include a rapid mick, mick, and a chattering shee-shee.

== Distribution ==
The Brown-backed honeyeater is found along the coast of Far North Queensland, particularly around the Cape York Peninsula. Its range extends across the islands of the Torres Strait and into New Guinea.

Unlike similar birds that migrate across the Torres Strait, the Brown-backed honeyeater is partly resident and nomadic, meaning it tends to stay in the same area year-round but will travel depending on environmental factors, such as food availability and rainfall. It is thought to be seasonally migratory in parts of north east Queensland, moving south in August and north during the spring.

== Habitat ==
It is found in a wide variety of tropical or subtropical habitats near water in coastal areas, including open grassy woodlands, swamps, rainforests, mangroves, and gardens. Normally found individually or in pairs.

=== Feeding ===
The Brown-backed honeyeater feeds on small insects found in foliage and in flight, and nectar when available.
