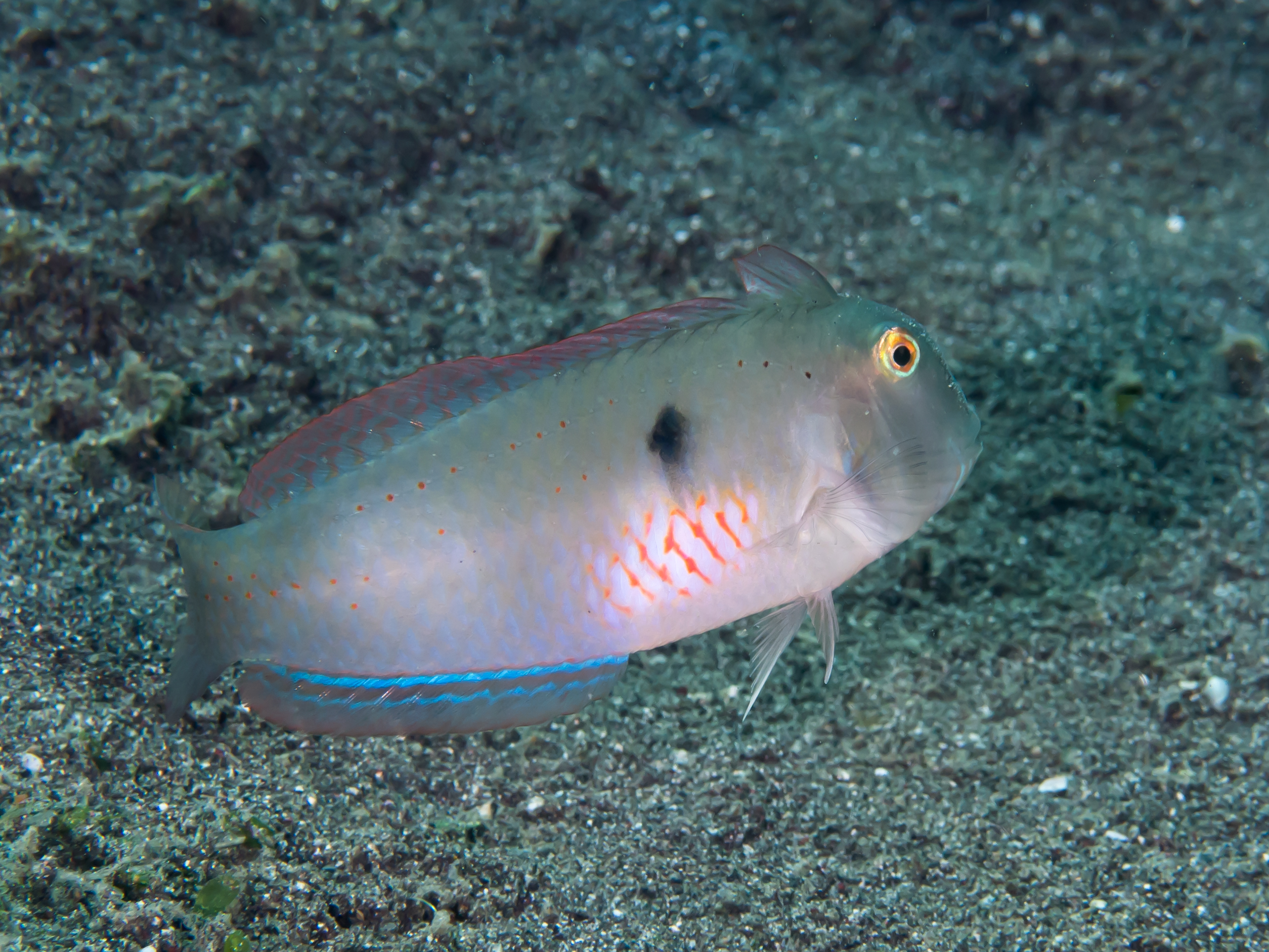

Conservation status
- Least Concern (IUCN 3.1)

Scientific classification
- Kingdom: Animalia
- Phylum: Chordata
- Class: Actinopterygii
- Division: Teleostei
- Order: Labriformes
- Family: Labridae
- Genus: Iniistius
- Species: I. pentadactylus

Binomial name
- Iniistius pentadactylus (Linnaeus, 1758)

Synonyms
- Coryphaena pentadactyla Linnaeus, 1758; Hemipteronotus pentadactylus (Linnaeus, 1758); Xyrichtys pentadactylus (Linnaeus, 1758); Xirichthys cyanirostris Guérin-Méneville, 1829; Novacula sexmaculata Valenciennes, 1840; Xyrichtys virens Valenciennes, 1840

= Iniistius pentadactylus =

Species of fish

Iniistius pentadactylus, the fivefinger wrasse or fivefinger razorfish, is a species of marine ray-finned fish from the family Labridae, the wrasses, which has a wide Indo-Pacific distribution.

== Description ==
Iniistius pentadactylus is a pale-grey wrasse with several overlapping red spots, which appear black underwater, along the lateral line to the rear of the head. There is frequently a brown blotch immediately to the posterior of the tip of the pectoral fin. The females do not show the spots along the lateral line but do show a large white area with red scale margins on the lower flanks. The species within the genus Iniistius have very compressed bodies and a steep forehead which has a hard knife-like edge, used to dive into the sand when threatened, leading to the common name razorfish. This species has 9 spines in its dorsal fin, the first two of which are divided from the others by a notch. The dorsal fin also has 12 soft rays, while the anal fin has 3 spines and 12–13 soft rays. The largest males of this species attain a total length of 25 centimetres (9.8 in).

== Distribution ==
Iniistius pentadactylus has a distribution which extends from the eastern coast of Africa from the Red Sea found from the Red Sea south to Mozambique, eastwards to Guam. In the Pacific its range reaches as far north as the Ryukyus and the Ogasawara Islands and south to the Great Barrier Reef, and Christmas Island, Australia.

== Habitat and biology ==
Iniistius pentadactylus occurs over sandy substrates in coastal areas as well as in areas with some sea grass or algae. It can be found at depths of more than 18 metres (59 ft). It is normally recorded in large, dispersed groups frequenting the upper slopes of sand and mud banks, the males are territorial, defending a territory which contains many females. This species buries itself in the sand so that it can sleep safely at night but will dive into the sand to hide when threatened, then it dives head-first into the sand and it may take some time to emerge again. This species feeds mainly on hard-shelled invertebrates, such as molluscs and crustaceans.
