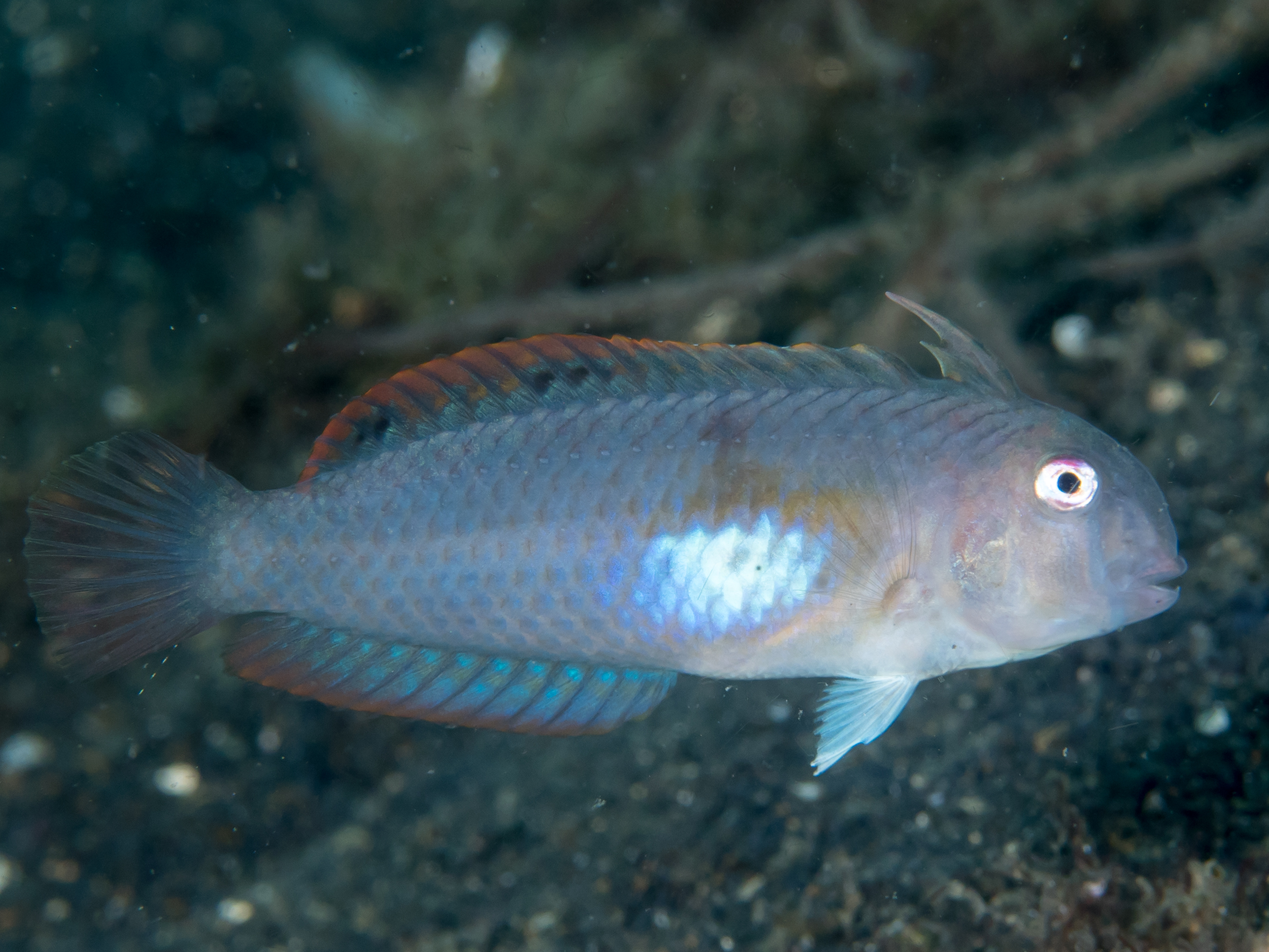

Conservation status
- Least Concern (IUCN 3.1)

Scientific classification
- Kingdom: Animalia
- Phylum: Chordata
- Class: Actinopterygii
- Order: Labriformes
- Family: Labridae
- Genus: Iniistius
- Species: I. melanopus

Binomial name
- Iniistius melanopus Bleeker, 1857

Synonyms
- Novacula melanopus Bleeker, 1857; Hemipteronotus melanopus (Bleeker, 1857); Xyrichtys melanopus (Bleeker, 1857)

= Iniistius melanopus =

Species of fish

Iniistius melanopus, the yellowpatch razorfish, is a species of marine ray-finned fish from the family Labridae, the wrasses. It is found in the Indo-West Pacific.

== Description ==
This species reaches a length of 26.0 cm (10.2 in).
