= Thryssa whiteheadi =

Whitehead's thryssa

Conservation status
- Least Concern (IUCN 3.1)

Scientific classification
- Kingdom: Animalia
- Phylum: Chordata
- Class: Actinopterygii
- Order: Clupeiformes
- Family: Engraulidae
- Genus: Thryssa
- Species: T. whiteheadi

Binomial name
- Thryssa whiteheadi Wongratana, 1983

Species of fish

Thryssa whiteheadi, the Whitehead's thryssa, is a species of ray-finned fish in the family Engraulidae. It is found in the Western Indian Ocean.

== Size ==
This species reaches a length of 15.8 cm (6.2 in).

== Etymology ==
The fish is named in honor of Peter J. P. Whitehead (1930–1993), of the British Museum (Natural History), whose 1965 review of Red Sea clupeoids "was a major step in understanding the species of this region".
