= Iniistius spilonotus =

Scientific classification
- Kingdom: Animalia
- Phylum: Chordata
- Class: Actinopterygii
- Order: Labriformes
- Family: Labridae
- Genus: Iniistius
- Species: I. spilonotus

Binomial name
- Iniistius spilonotus (Bleeker, 1857)

Synonyms
- Novacula spilonotus Bleeker, 1857; Xyrichtys spilonotus (Bleeker, 1857)

Species of fish

Iniistius spilonotus, the three-banded razorfish or blue razor wrasse, is a species of marine ray-finned fish in the family Labridae, the wrasses. It is found in the western Pacific Ocean.
