= Helen Norton Stevens =

American journalist (1869–1943)

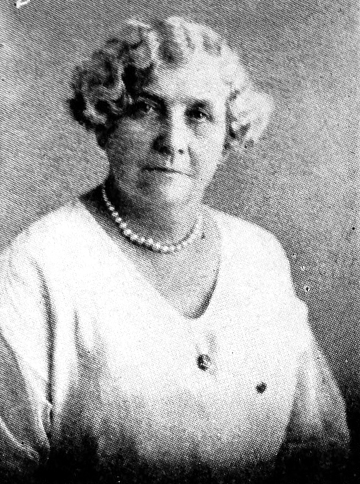
- Born: January 7, 1869; Burlington
- Died: March 21, 1943; Seattle
- Occupation: Journalist

Helen Louise Wetzler Norton Stevens (January 7, 1869 – March 21, 1943) was the editor of the bulletin of the Washington State Federation of Women's Clubs.

== Biography ==
Helen Louise Wetzler Norton was born in Burlington, Iowa, on January 7, 1869, the daughter of John Norton and Anna M. Wetzler.

She moved to Washington state in 1893 and lived at 404 Haight Building, Seattle, Washington.

She married Frank Cushing Stevens. Their children were: Dwight Norton, Robert Wetzler, Anna S. Crocker.

For 7 years she was the editor of The Western Woman's Outlook, the official organ of the Washington State Federation of Women's Clubs; she was fired in 1914 when an opposite faction to hers took the majority share in the magazine. She was correspondent of several newspapers; chairman of Civic Department of the Seattle Woman's Club; treasurer of the League of Women Voters.

She was the author of the Memorial biography of Adele M. Fielde, humanitarian.

She was also a member of: Seattle Woman's Club, League of Women Voters, Lady Stirling Chapter of Daughters of the American Revolution.

She died on March 21, 1943, in Seattle, Washington, and is buried at Mount Pleasant Cemetery, Seattle, Washington.
