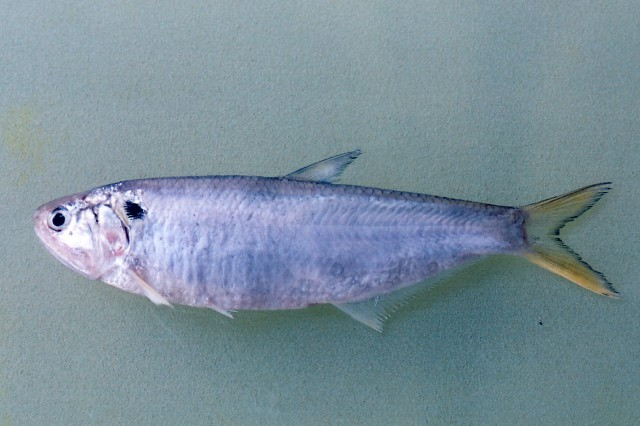
- Thryssa mystax

Conservation status
- Least Concern (IUCN 3.1)

Scientific classification
- Kingdom: Animalia
- Phylum: Chordata
- Class: Actinopterygii
- Division: Teleostei
- Order: Clupeiformes
- Family: Engraulidae
- Genus: Thryssa
- Species: T. mystax

Binomial name
- Thryssa mystax (Bloch & J. G. Schneider, 1801)

Synonyms
- Clupea mystax Bloch & Schneider, 1801; Engraulis mystax (Bloch & Schneider, 1801); Scutengraulis mystax (Bloch & Schneider, 1801); Thrissocles mystax (Bloch & Schneider, 1801 ); Thrissa mystax (Bloch & Schneider, 1801); Clupea subspinosa Swainson, 1839; Thryssa subspinosa (Swainson, 1839); Thryssa poorawa Jerdon, 1851; Thryssa poorawah Jerdon, 1851; Engraulis mystacoides Bleeker, 1852; Stolephorus valenciennesi Bleeker, 1866; Scutengraulis valenciennesi (Bleeker, 1866); Thryssa valenciennesi (Bleeker, 1866); Engraulis hornelli Fowler, 1924

= Thryssa mystax =

Moustached thryssa

Species of ray-finned fish

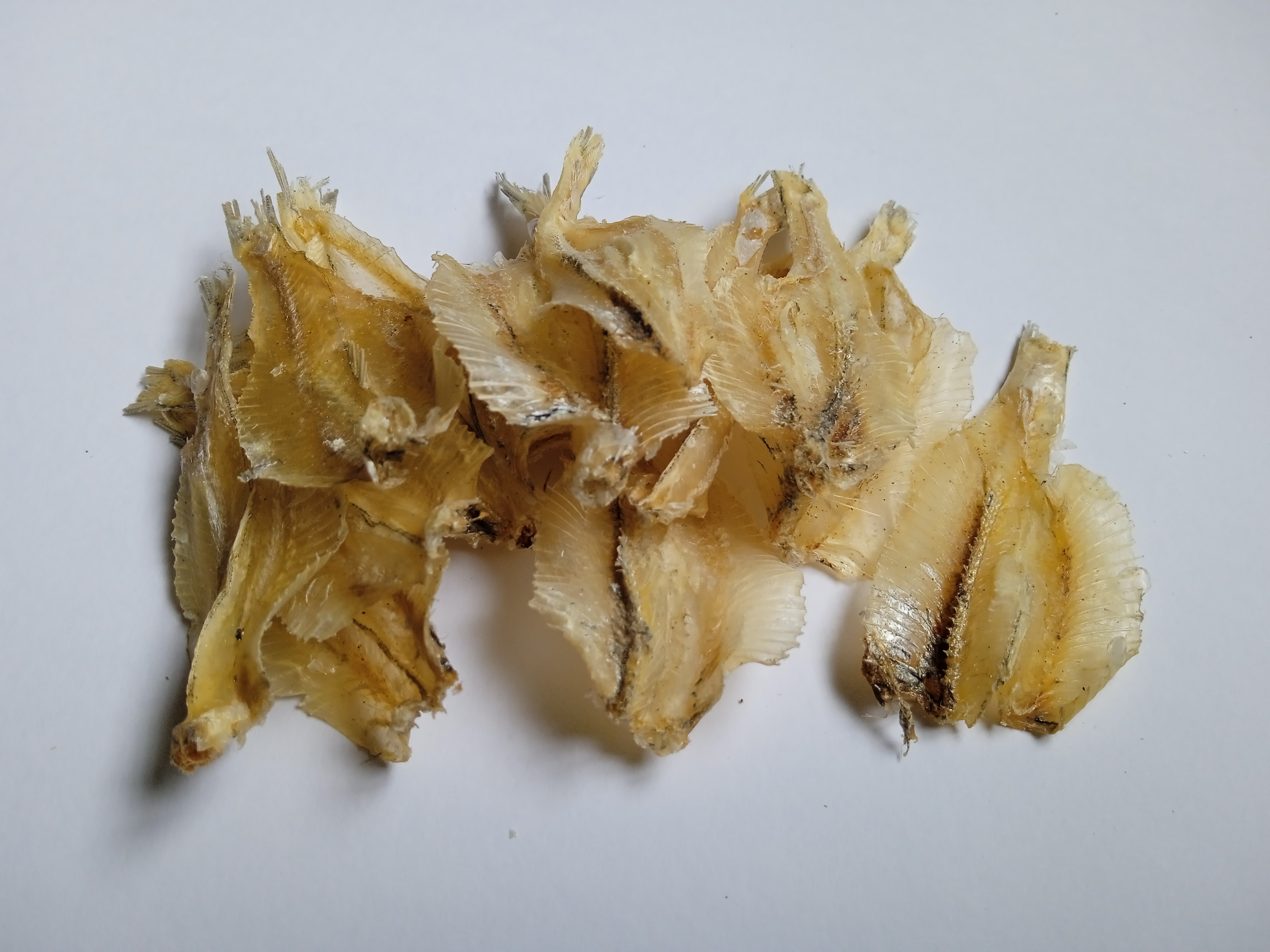
Thryssa mystax as food, dried and deep-fried in Southeast Asian cuisine

Thryssa mystax, the moustached thryssa or Gangetic anchovy, is a species of oceanodromous ray-finned fish in the family Engraulidae. It is found in the tropical western Indo-Pacific region from India, Sri Lanka to Myanmar and south to Java, and Indonesia.

It is a small schooling fish found in depths up to 50 m (160 ft). Maximum length does not exceed 15.5 cm (6.1 in). The fish has 11 to 12 dorsal soft rays and only present 29 to 37 anal soft rays. There are 24 to 32 keeled scutes from isthmus to anus on belly region. Lower gill rakers are serrated. Body is silver, darker dorsally. There is a distinctive dark blotch behind upper part of gill opening, which can easily identify the species from other Thryssa species. Caudal fin is yellowish. It feeds on plankton, fish larvae, and small crustaceans like shrimp larvae.

== Notes ==
the fleshy throat region of a fish which extends forward from the ventral part of the chest and narrows anteriorly
