= Thryssa rastrosa =

Fly river thryssa

Conservation status
- Endangered (IUCN 3.1)

Scientific classification
- Kingdom: Animalia
- Phylum: Chordata
- Class: Actinopterygii
- Order: Clupeiformes
- Family: Engraulidae
- Genus: Thryssa
- Species: T. rastrosa

Binomial name
- Thryssa rastrosa T. R. Roberts, 1978

Species of fish

Thryssa rastrosa, the Fly River thryssa, is a species of ray-finned fish in the family Engraulidae. It is found in Oceania.

== Size ==
This species reaches a length of 12 cm (4.7 in).
