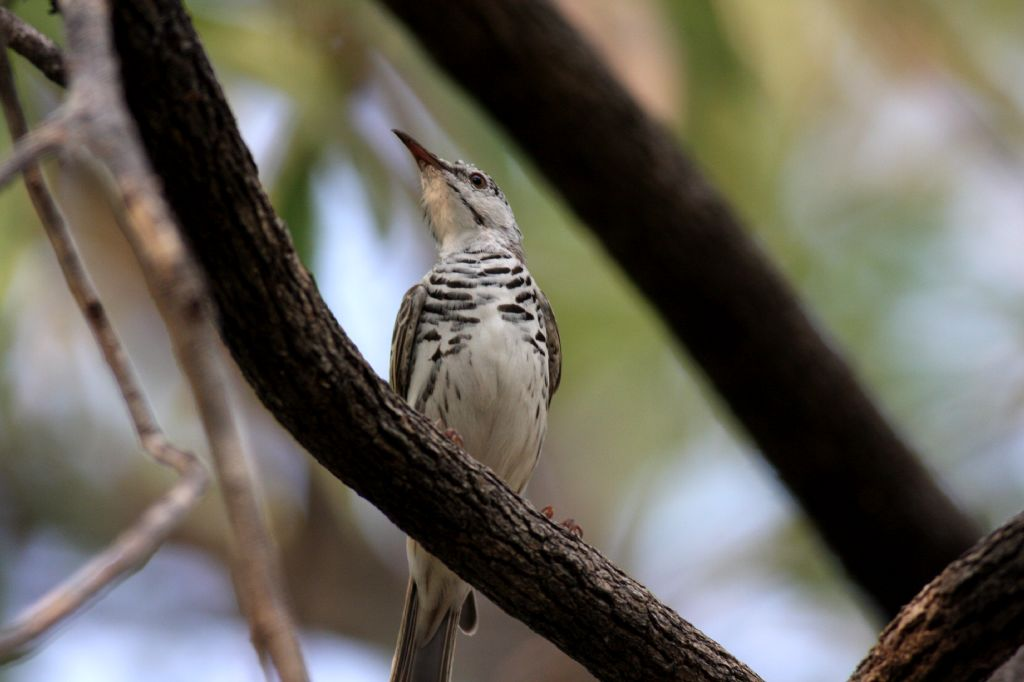
- Bar-breasted honeyeater (Ramsayornis fasciatus)

Scientific classification
- Kingdom: Animalia
- Phylum: Chordata
- Class: Aves
- Order: Passeriformes
- Family: Meliphagidae
- Genus: Ramsayornis; Mathews, 1912

Type species
- Gliciphila subfasciata Ramsay, 1858

= Ramsayornis =

Genus of birds

Ramsayornis is a genus of bird in the family Meliphagidae. It is found from Northern Australia to New Guinea. This genus of bird is characterized by the small size, pale ventral plumage with incomplete barring, and unmarked white throat and undertail. It contains the following species:

Image	Scientific name	Common name	Distribution
	Ramsayornis fasciatus	Bar-breasted honeyeater	northern Australia
	Ramsayornis modestus	Brown-backed honeyeater	New Guinea and Cape York Peninsula
