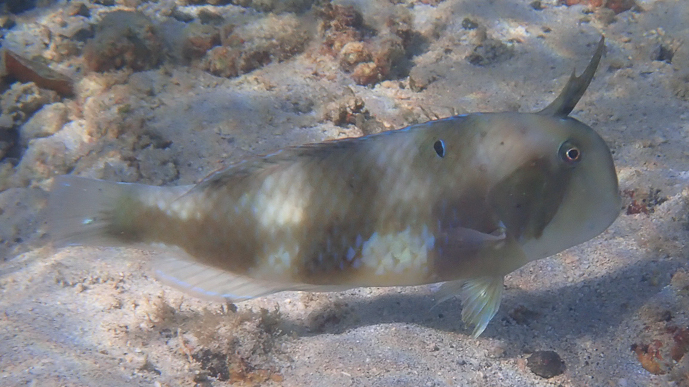

Conservation status
- Least Concern (IUCN 3.1)

Scientific classification
- Kingdom: Animalia
- Phylum: Chordata
- Class: Actinopterygii
- Order: Labriformes
- Family: Labridae
- Genus: Iniistius
- Species: I. pavo

Binomial name
- Iniistius pavo (Valenciennes, 1840)

Synonyms
- List: Hemipteronotus pavo (Valenciennes, 1840); Xyrichtys pavo Valenciennes, 1840; Novacula tessellata Valenciennes, 1840; Novacula immaculata Valenciennes, 1840; Xyrichthys pavoninus Valenciennes, 1840; Hemipteronotus pavoninus (Valenciennes, 1840); Iniistius pavoninus (Valenciennes, 1840); Xyrichthys puniceus Richardson, 1846; Novacula tetrazona Bleeker, 1858; Xyrichtys tetrazona (Bleeker, 1858); Iniistius mundicorpus Gill, 1862; Novacula carneoflava Peters, 1877; Novacula nigra Steindachner, 1900; Hemipteronotus niger (Steindachner, 1900); Xyrichtys niger (Steindachner, 1900); Iniistius leucozonus Jenkins, 1901; Iniistius cacatua Waite, 1901; Novacula temporalis Regan, 1905; Xyrichthys panamensis Fowler, 1944

= Iniistius pavo =

Species of fish

Iniistius pavo, the peacock wrasse or blue razorfish, is a species of marine ray-finned fish from the family Labridae, the wrasses, which has a wide Indo-Pacific distribution.

== Description ==
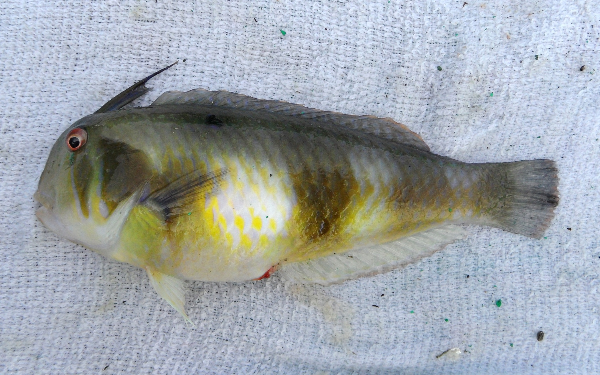
Adult

Iniistius pavo can be identified by the dark vertical bar situated below the eye. This species has a small dark spot below the forward portion of the dorsal fin, a white patch behind the side behind the pectoral fin, and an oblique brown bar underneath the eye. It normally shows 5 dark bars when adult when the belly of female turns red. Juveniles have a black anal fin and two large eyespots which have narrow white margins in their dorsal fin. The first two spines in the dorsal fin form a separate fin. It has a highly compressed body and a steep, sharp-edged forehead, like other members of the genus Iniistius. In juveniles this separate fin formed by the first two spines takes the form of a long, bannerlike filament but as the fish ages this shortens. The colour of the juveniles varies from whitish with dark bars on the body, to an overall brown colour. The small juveniles drift in the water mimicking leaves and debris. This fish may attain a total length of 42 centimetres (17 in).

Juveniles

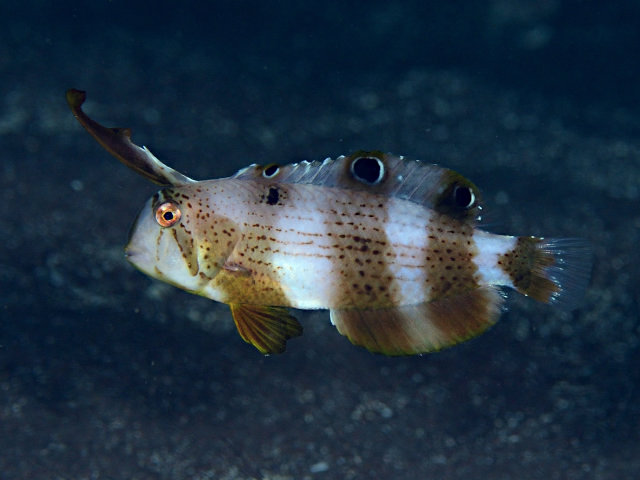

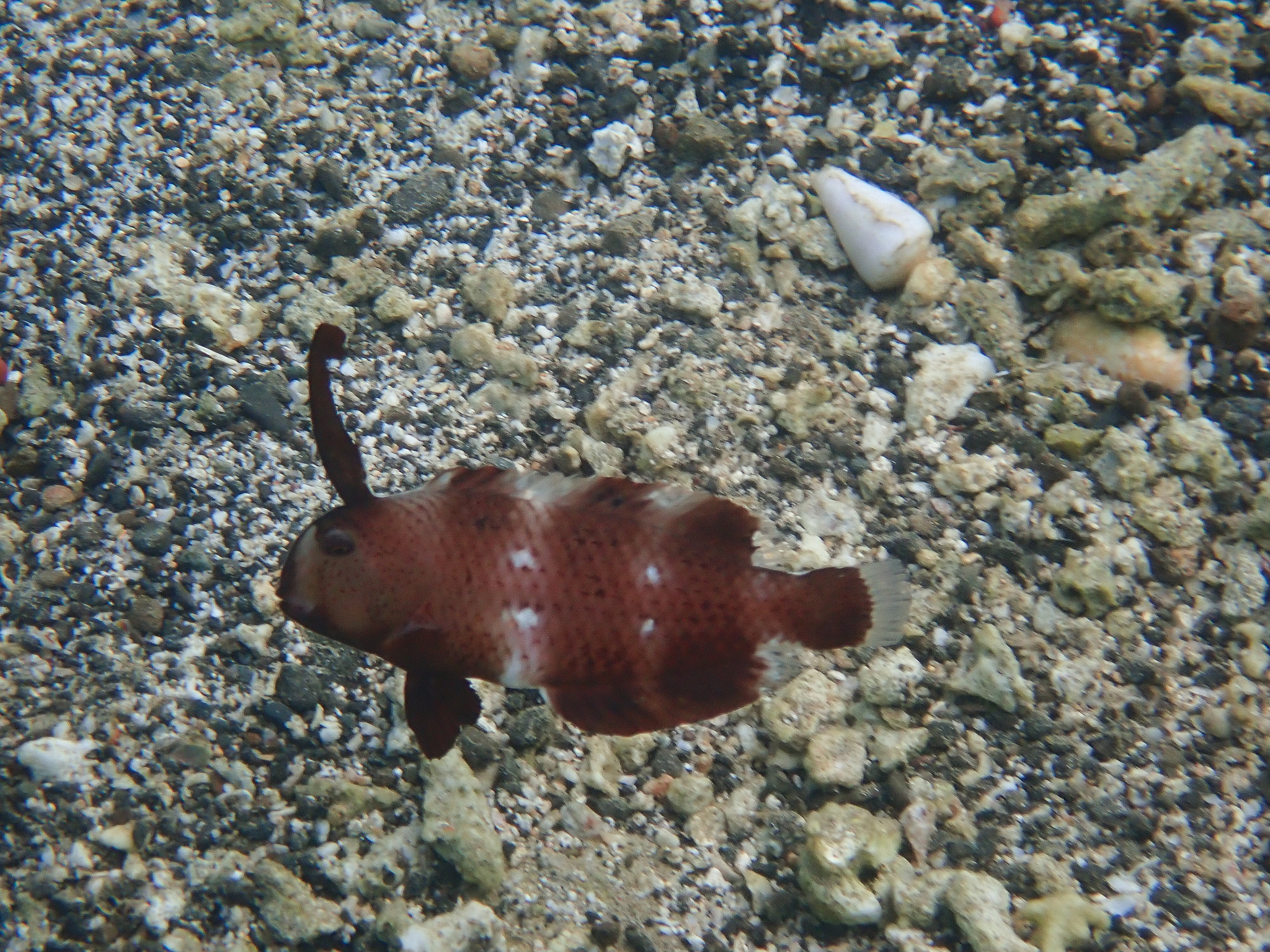

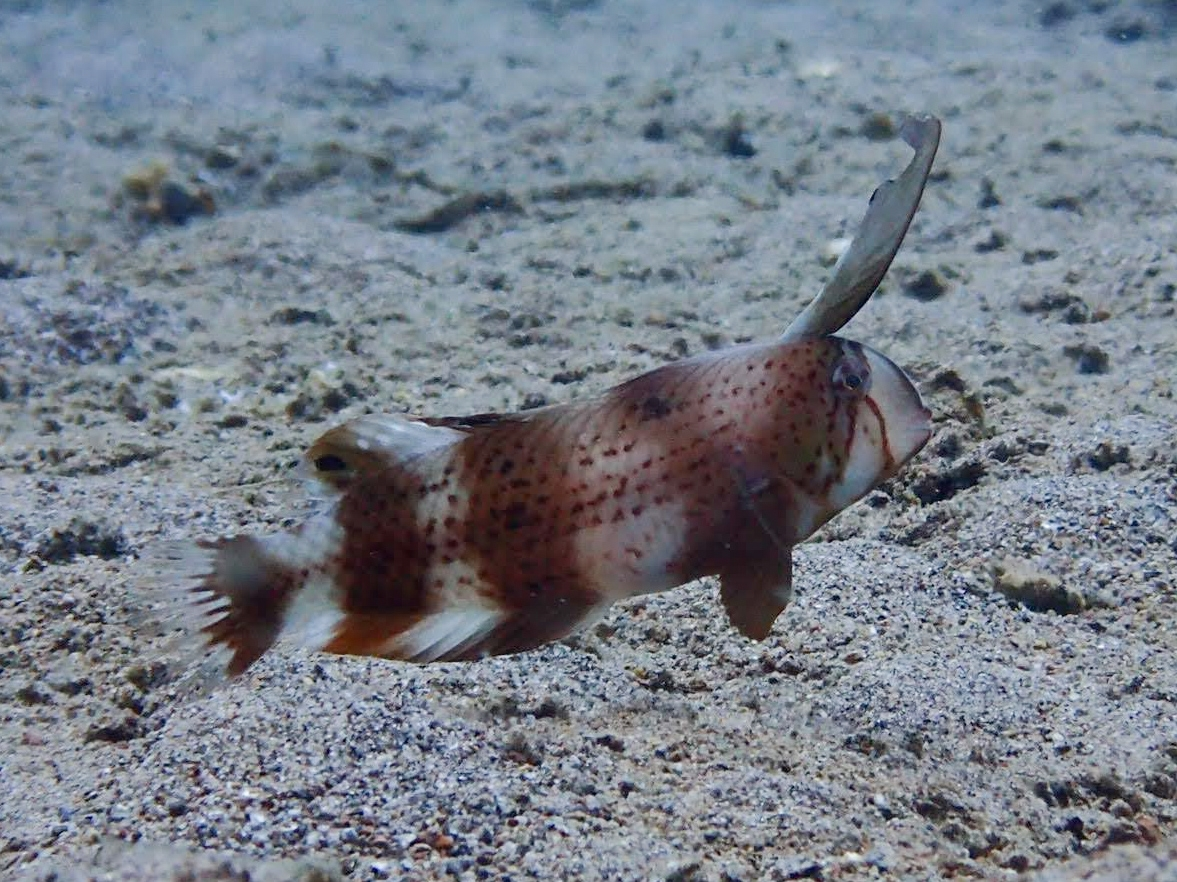

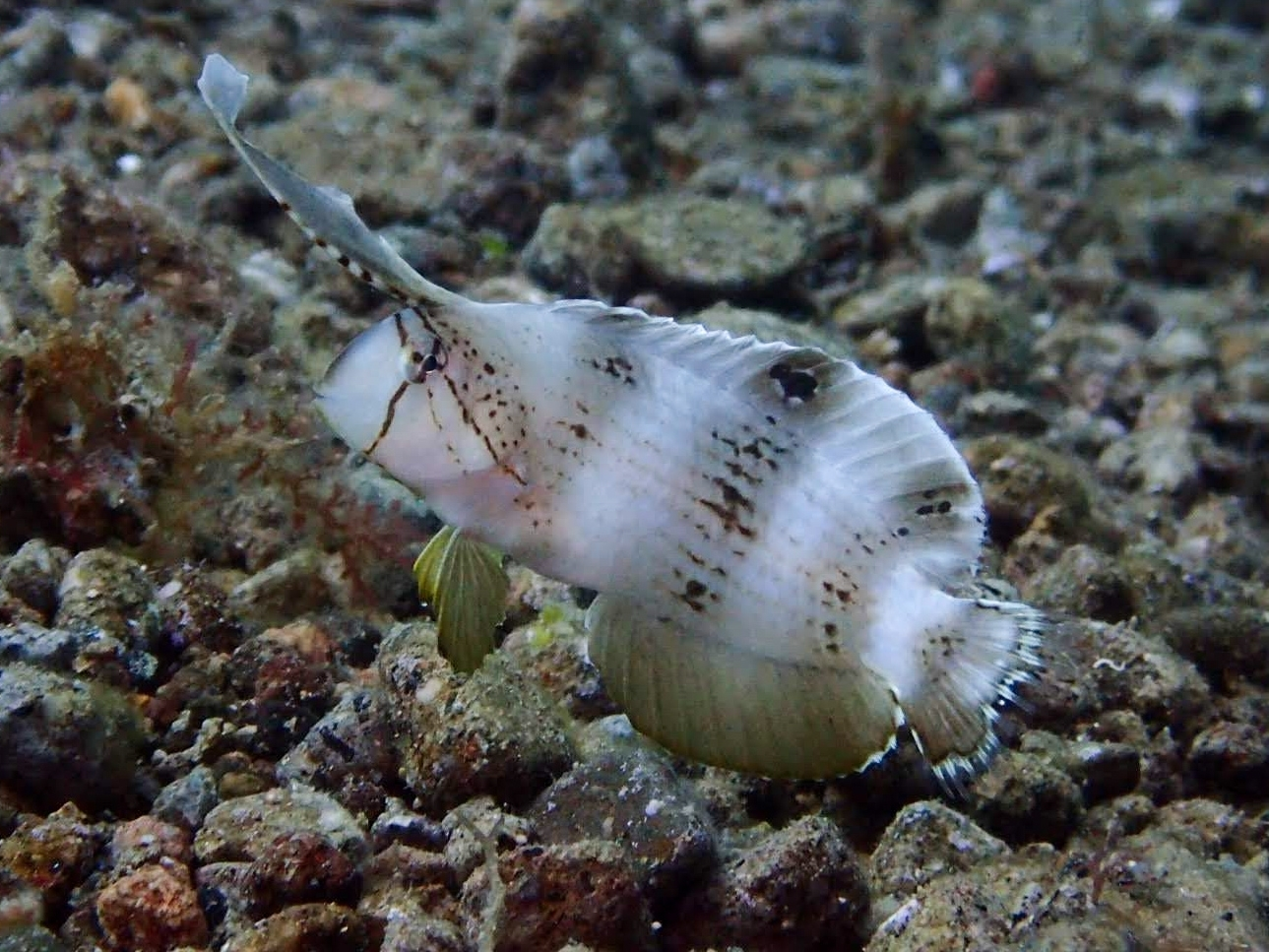

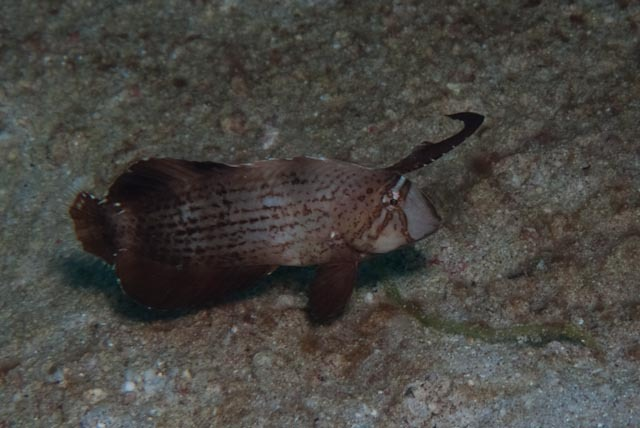

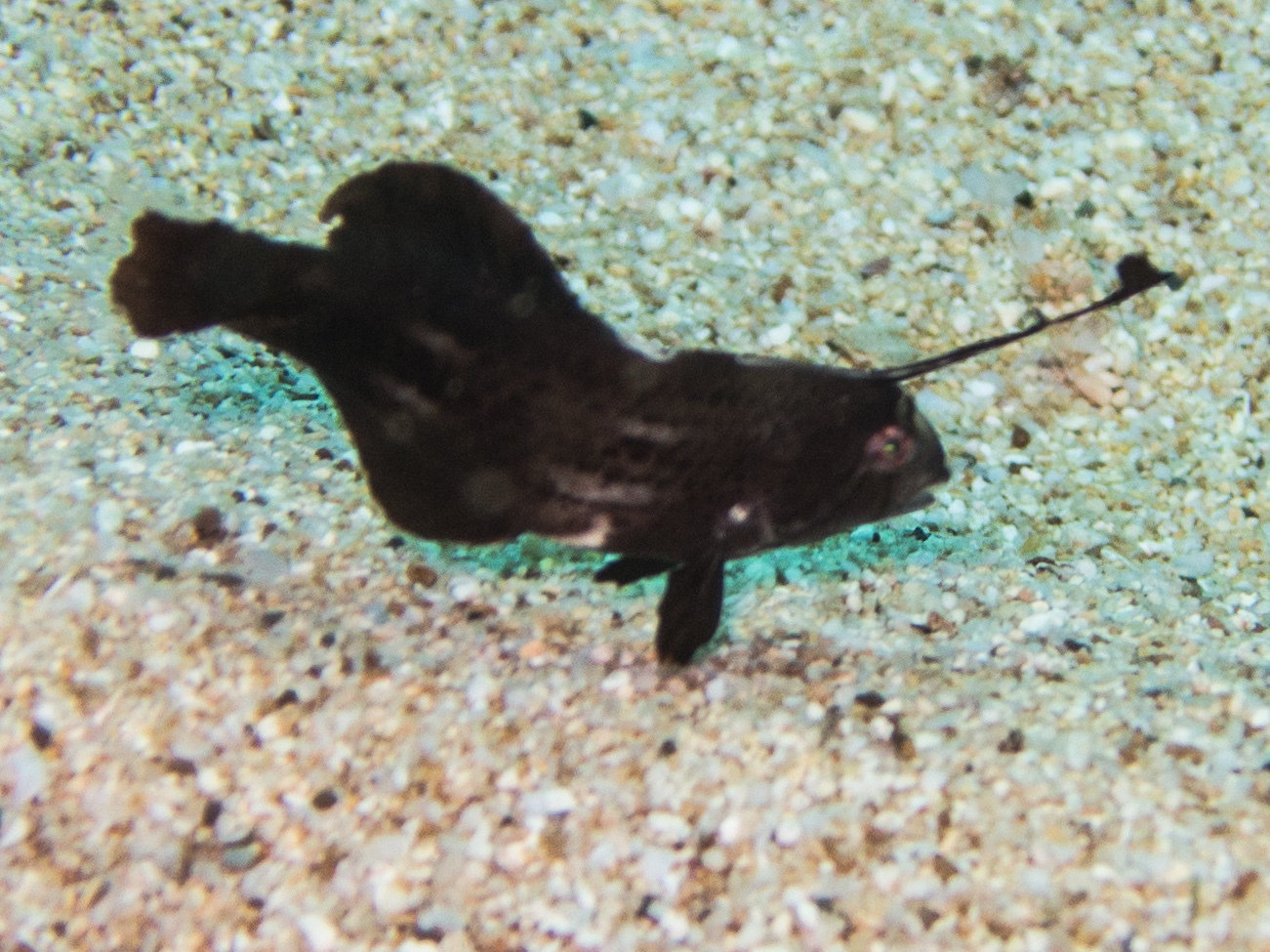

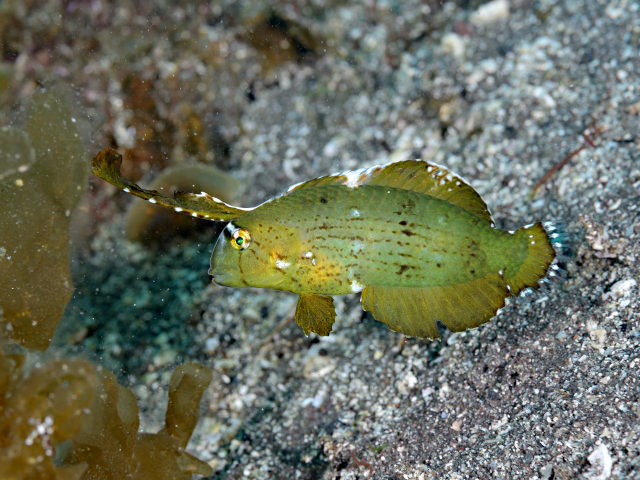

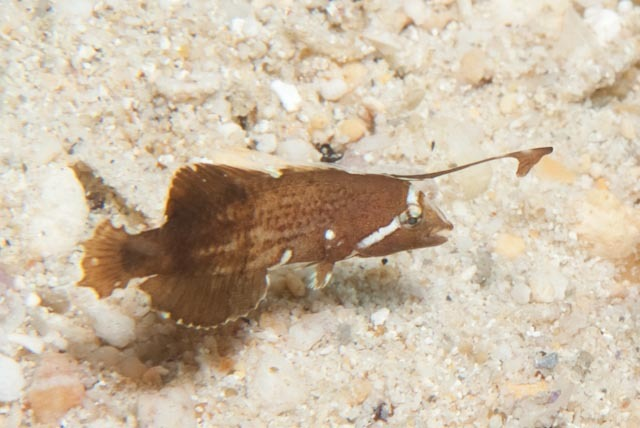

== Distribution ==
Iniistius pavo has an Indo-Pacific distribution which extends from the Red Sea and the east African coast as far south as KwaZulu-Natal eastwards to the Society Islands, north to southern Japan and Hawaii and south to New Caledonia, Lord Howe Island and New South Wales. It also occurs in the Eastern Pacific from the Gulf of California to Panama and the Galapagos Islands.

== Habitat and biology ==
Iniistius pavo is normally found as a solitary, benthic and benthopelagic species in lagoon and seaward reef areas where the substrate consists of fine to loose, coarse sand. The juveniles are sometimes recorded in shallow estuaries. The adults are rare in water which is less than 20 metres (66 ft). The species dives into the sand to sleep securely at night and also will go this to hide when threatened, using the sharp edge to the snout to speedily bury itself. It feeds on hard-shelled invertebrates, such as molluscs and crustaceans. The juveniles use the elongated, detached front portion of their dorsal fin to impersonate drifting dead leaves.

== Species description and taxonomy ==
Iniistius pavo was formally described as Xyrichtys pavo in 1840 with the type locality given as Mauritius. When Theodore Nicholas Gill erected the genus Iniistius he named this species as the type species.

== Human usage ==
Iniistius pavo is not a commercially exploited quarry species, its flesh is said to be highly palatable and when large enough fish are caught they may be marketed. It is occasionally collected for the aquarium trade.
