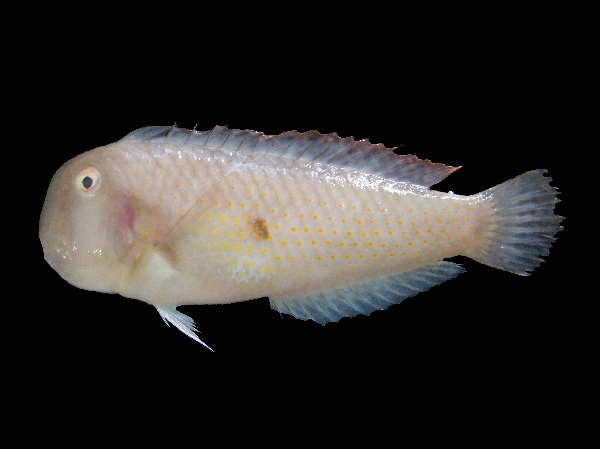

Conservation status
- Least Concern (IUCN 3.1)

Scientific classification
- Kingdom: Animalia
- Phylum: Chordata
- Class: Actinopterygii
- Order: Labriformes
- Family: Labridae
- Genus: Iniistius
- Species: I. bimaculatus

Binomial name
- Iniistius bimaculatus (Rüppell, 1829)

Synonyms
- List: Xyrichtys bimaculatus Rüppell, 1829; Novacula punctulata Valenciennes, 1840; Hemipteronotus punctulatus (Valenciennes, 1840); Xyrichtys punctulatus (Valenciennes, 1840); Hemipteronotus hypospilus Schultz, 1960; Xyrichtys hypospilus (Schultz, 1960)

= Iniistius bimaculatus =

Species of fish

Iniistius bimaculatus, the two-spot razorfish, is a species of marine ray-finned fish from the family Labridae, the wrasses. It is found in the Indo-West Pacific, the Red Sea, the Persian Gulf, and off the coasts of India.

== Description ==
This species reaches a length of 28.5 cm (11.2 in).
