= Thryssa stenosoma =

Slender thryssa

Conservation status
- Data Deficient (IUCN 3.1)

Scientific classification
- Kingdom: Animalia
- Phylum: Chordata
- Class: Actinopterygii
- Order: Clupeiformes
- Family: Engraulidae
- Genus: Thryssa
- Species: T. stenosoma

Binomial name
- Thryssa stenosoma Wongratana, 1983

Species of fish

Thryssa stenosoma, the slender thryssa, is a species of ray-finned fish in the family Engraulidae. It is found in the eastern Indian Ocean.

== Size ==
This species reaches a length of 15 cm (5.9 in).
