= Thryssa vitrirostris =

Orangemouth anchovy

Conservation status
- Least Concern (IUCN 3.1)

Scientific classification
- Kingdom: Animalia
- Phylum: Chordata
- Class: Actinopterygii
- Order: Clupeiformes
- Family: Engraulidae
- Genus: Thryssa
- Species: T. vitrirostris

Binomial name
- Thryssa vitrirostris (Gilchrist & W. W. Thompson, 1908)

Synonyms
- Engraulis vitrirostris Gilchrist & Thompson, 1908; Thissina vitrirostris Hata & Motomura 2019

Species of fish

Thryssa vitrirostris, the orangemouth anchovy, is a species of ray-finned fish in the family Engraulidae. It is found in the Indian Ocean.

== Size ==
This species reaches a length of 22 cm (8.7 in).
