= Thryssa polybranchialis =

Humphead thryssa

Conservation status
- Data Deficient (IUCN 3.1)

Scientific classification
- Kingdom: Animalia
- Phylum: Chordata
- Class: Actinopterygii
- Order: Clupeiformes
- Family: Engraulidae
- Genus: Thryssa
- Species: T. polybranchialis

Binomial name
- Thryssa polybranchialis Wongratana, 1983

Species of fish

Thryssa polybranchialis, the humphead thryssa, is a species of ray-finned fish in the family Engraulidae. It is found in the Indian Ocean.

== Size ==
This species reaches a length of 21.5 cm (8.5 in).
