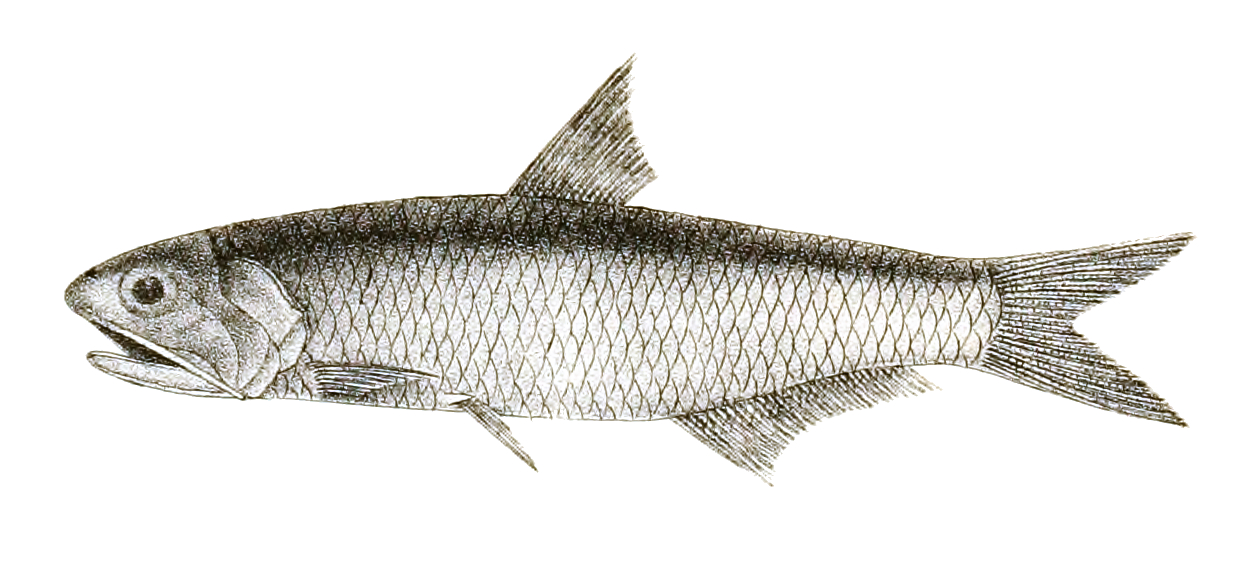

Conservation status
- Least Concern (IUCN 3.1)

Scientific classification
- Kingdom: Animalia
- Phylum: Chordata
- Class: Actinopterygii
- Order: Clupeiformes
- Family: Engraulidae
- Genus: Thryssa
- Species: T. baelama

Binomial name
- Thryssa baelama (Fabricius, 1775)

Synonyms
- Anchovia apiensis evermanni Jordan & Seale, 1906; Clupea baelama Forsskål, 1775; Engraulis baelama (Forsskål, 1775); Engraulis macrops Kishinouye, 1911; Engraulis nesogallicus Bennett, 1832; Engraulis polynemoides Günther, 1868; Engraulis samam Montrouzier, 1857; Scutengraulis baelama (Forsskål, 1775); Thrissa baelama (Forsskål, 1775); Thrissina baelama (Forsskål, 1775); Thrissocles baelama (Forsskål, 1775)

= Thryssa baelama =

Baelama anchovy

Species of fish

Thryssa baelama, the Baelama anchovy, is a species of ray-finned fish in the family Engraulidae. It is found in the Indo-Pacific.

== Size ==
This species reaches a length of 16 cm (6.3 in).
