= Thryssa dayi =

Day's thryssa

Conservation status
- Data Deficient (IUCN 3.1)

Scientific classification
- Kingdom: Animalia
- Phylum: Chordata
- Class: Actinopterygii
- Order: Clupeiformes
- Family: Engraulidae
- Genus: Thryssa
- Species: T. dayi

Binomial name
- Thryssa dayi Wongratana, 1983

Species of fish

Thryssa dayi, also known as Day's thryssa, is a species of ray-finned fish in the family Engraulidae. It is found in the western Indian Ocean.

== Size ==
This species reaches a length of 21.5 cm (8.5 in).

== Etymology ==
The fish is named in honor of Francis Day (1829–1889), the Inspector-General of Fisheries in India.
