= Edward Pierson Ramsay =

Australian zoologist

Edward Pierson Ramsay FRSE FLS
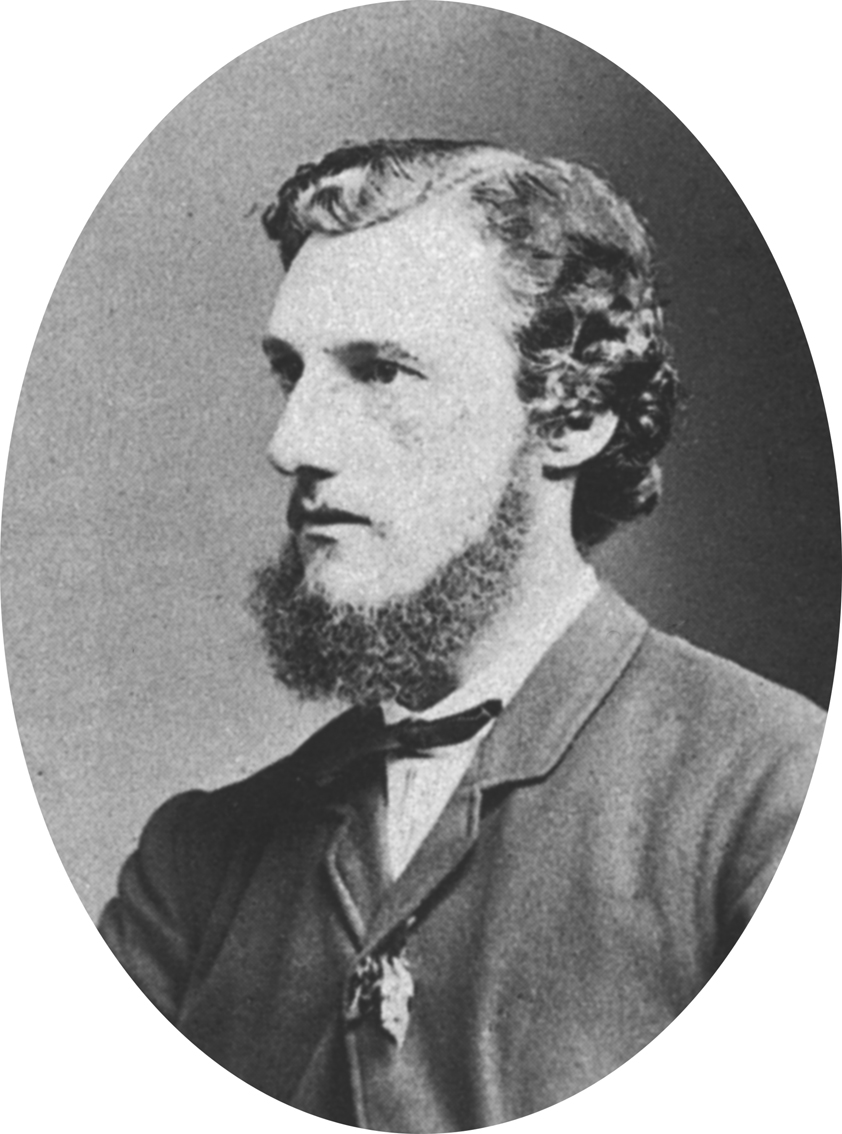

Personal details
- Born: 3 December 1842 Dobroyd Estate, Long Cove, Sydney, Colony of New South Wales
- Died: 16 December 1916 (aged 74)
- Scientific career
- Fields: Zoologist, ornithologist
- Author abbrev. (zoology): Ramsay, E.P. Ramsay

Edward Pierson Ramsay (3 December 1842 – 16 December 1916) was an Australian zoologist who specialised in ornithology.

== Early life ==
Ramsay was born in Dobroyd Estate, Long Cove, Sydney, and educated at St Mark's Collegiate School, The King's School, Parramatta. He studied medicine from 1863 to 1865 at the University of Sydney but did not graduate.

== Career ==
Although he never had had any formal scientific training in zoology, Ramsay had a keen interest in natural history and published many papers.

In 1883 Ramsay traveled to London to attend the International Fisheries Exhibition. At that time he met Military Surgeon Francis Day who had collected fishes over several decades in India, Burma, Malaysia and other areas in southern Asia. Ramsay negotiated purchase a portion of Day's collection, including about 150 of Day's type specimens.

Presumably during the same trip to Britain he visited Edinburgh, as he was elected an Ordinary Fellow of the Royal Society of Edinburgh (requiring his physical presence) in April 1884. His proposers were Sir John Murray, Sir William Turner, James Geikie and William Carmichael McIntosh.

== Late life ==
After his resignation as Curator, Ramsay served the Australian Museum as "consulting ornithologist" until 1909. He died on 16 December 1916 because of carcinoma.

== Taxa described by him ==
Among organisms Ramsay described are:

- northern death adder (Acanthophis praelongus)
- the pig-nosed turtle (Carettochelys insculpta)
- the giant bandicoot (Peroryctes broadbenti)
- the grey-headed robin (Heteromyias cinereifrons)
- The freshwater anchovy (Thryssa scratchleyi)
- Papuan king parrot (Alisterus chloropterus)

See Category:Taxa named by Edward Pierson Ramsay.

== Taxa named in his honor ==
Ramsay is commemorated in the scientific names of two species of Australian snakes, Aspidites ramsayi and Austrelaps ramsayi.

The Spotted grubfish Parapercis ramsayi is believed to be named after him.

Ramsayornis is a meliphagid genus which is named after him. It contains two species:

- Bar-breasted Honeyeater Ramsayornis fasciatus (Gould, 1843)
- Brown-backed Honeyeater Ramsayornis modestus (Gray, GR, 1858)

Government offices
| Preceded by Gerard Krefft (1861–1874) | Curator, The Australian Museum, Sydney, New South Wales; 1874–1895 | Succeeded by Robert Etheridge Jr. (1895–1919) |
