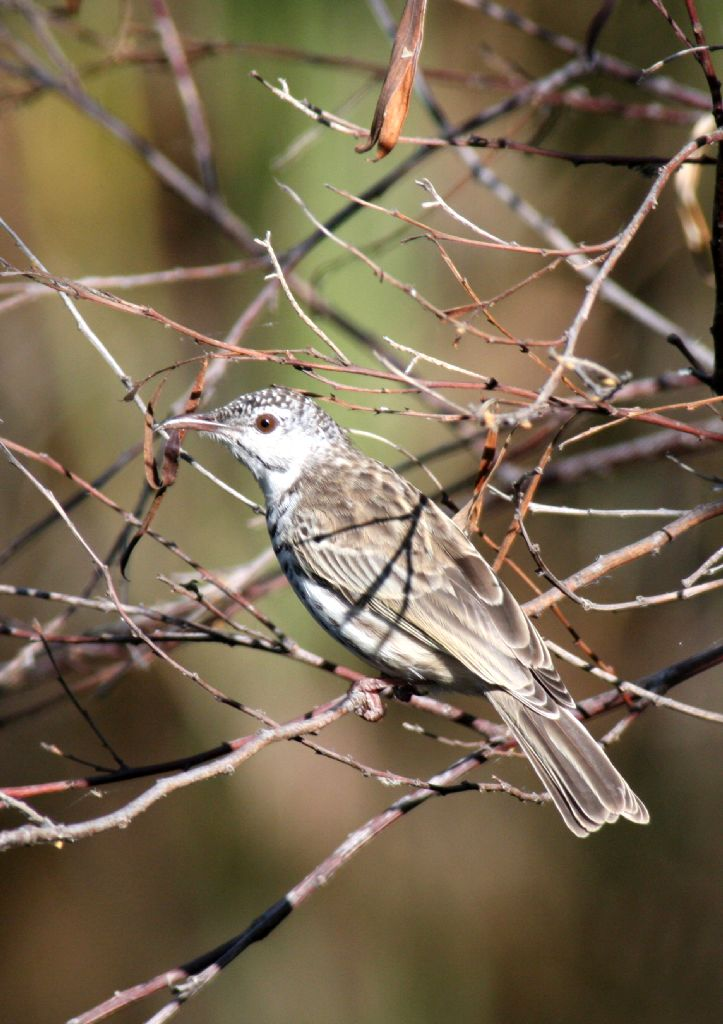

Conservation status
- Least Concern (IUCN 3.1)

Scientific classification
- Kingdom: Animalia
- Phylum: Chordata
- Class: Aves
- Order: Passeriformes
- Family: Meliphagidae
- Genus: Ramsayornis
- Species: R. fasciatus

Binomial name
- Ramsayornis fasciatus (Gould, 1843)

= Bar-breasted honeyeater =

Species of bird

The bar-breasted honeyeater (Ramsayornis fasciatus), also known as the White-breasted honeyeater, is a species of bird in the family Meliphagidae. It is endemic to northern Australia, with a breeding season from late spring to winter. It feeds primarily on nectar and invertebrates.
