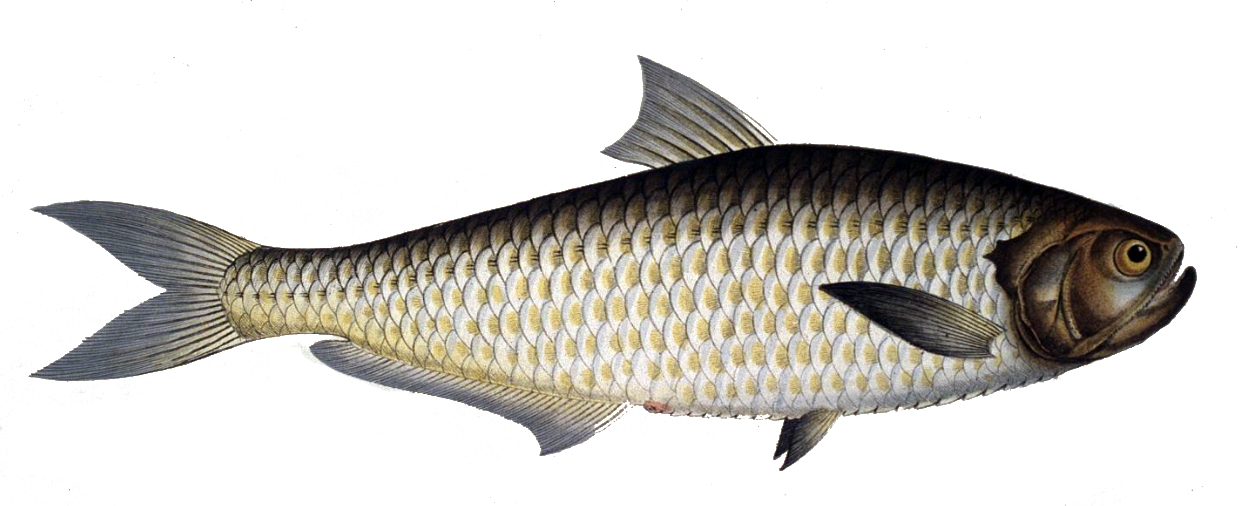
- Thryssa malabarica

Scientific classification
- Kingdom: Animalia
- Phylum: Chordata
- Class: Actinopterygii
- Division: Teleostei
- Order: Clupeiformes
- Family: Engraulidae
- Subfamily: Coiliinae
- Genus: Thryssa; Cuvier, 1829

Type species
- Clupea setirostris Broussonet, 1782

= Thryssa =

Genus of ray-finned fishes

Thryssa is a genus of anchovies in the family Engraulidae. Some authorities include the species from the genus Thrissina here.

It contains the following species:

== Species ==
- Thryssa adelae (Rutter, 1897) (Swatow thryssa)
- Thryssa aestuaria (J. D. Ogilby, 1910) (Estuarine thryssa)
- Thryssa brevicauda T. R. Roberts, 1978 (Short-tail thryssa)
- Thryssa cuvierii (Swainson, 1839)
- Thryssa dayi Wongratana, 1983 (Day's thryssa)
- Thryssa dussumieri (Valenciennes, 1848) (Dussumier's thryssa)
- Thryssa encrasicholoides (Bleeker, 1852) (False baelama anchovy)
- Thryssa gautamiensis Babu Rao, 1971 (Gautama thryssa)
- Thryssa hamiltonii J. E. Gray, 1835 (Hamilton's thryssa)
- Thryssa kammalensis (Bleeker, 1849) (Kammal thryssa)
- Thryssa kammalensoides Wongratana, 1983 (Godavari thryssa)
- Thryssa malabarica (Bloch, 1795) (Malabar thryssa)
- Thryssa marasriae Wongratana, 1987 (Marasri's thryssa)
- Thryssa mystax (Bloch & J. G. Schneider, 1801) (Moustached thryssa)
- Thryssa nasuta (Castelnau, 1878)
- Thryssa polybranchialis Wongratana, 1983 (Humphead thryssa)
- Thryssa porava Bleeker, 1849
- Thryssa purava (F. Hamilton, 1822) (Oblique-jaw thryssa)
- Thryssa rastrosa T. R. Roberts, 1978 (Fly River thryssa)
- Thryssa scratchleyi (E. P. Ramsay & J. D. Ogilby, 1886) (Freshwater anchovy)
- Thryssa setirostris (Broussonet, 1782) (Longjaw thryssa)
- Thryssa spinidens (D. S. Jordan & Seale, 1925) (Bengal thryssa)
- Thryssa stenosoma Wongratana, 1983 (Slender thryssa)
- Thryssa valenciennesi (Bleeker, 1866)
