= Gizzard shad =

Gizzard shad is a common name, or part of the proposed common names, for several species of herring-like fish currently classified in the family Dorosomatidae:

- American gizzard shad (Dorosoma cepedianum), the species most commonly referred to as simply “gizzard shad”
- Arabian gizzard shad (Nematalosa arabica)
- Australian river gizzard shad or bony bream (Nematalosa erebi)
- Bloch’s gizzard shad (Nematalosa nasus)
- Burmese river gizzard shad (Gonialosa modesta)
- Chacunda gizzard shad (Anodontostoma chacunda)
- Chinese gizzard shad (Clupanodon thrissa)
- Dotted gizzard shad or konoshiro (Konosirus punctatus)
- Fly River gizzard shad (Nematalosa flyensis)
- Galathea gizzard shad (Nematalosa galatheae)
- Ganges River gizzard shad (Gonialosa manmina)
- Gulf gizzard shad (Nematalosa resticularia)
- Indonesian gizzard shad (Anodontostoma selangkat)
- Mexican river gizzard shad (Dorosoma anale)
- Nicaragua gizzard shad (Dorosoma chavesi)
- Pacific gizzard shad (Dorosoma smithi)
- Persara gizzard shad (Nematalosa persara)
- Southern Burmese river gizzard shad (Gonialosa whiteheadi)
- Strickland River gizzard shad (Nematalosa papuensis)
- Thai gizzard shad (Anodontostoma thailandiae)
- Western Australia gizzard shad or Perth herring (Nematalosa vlaminghi)
