= Stolephorus astrum =

Scientific classification
- Kingdom: Animalia
- Phylum: Chordata
- Class: Actinopterygii
- Division: Teleostei
- Order: Clupeiformes
- Family: Engraulidae
- Genus: Stolephorus
- Species: S. astrum

Binomial name
- Stolephorus astrum Hata & Motomura, 2024

Species of anchovy

Stolephorus astrum, the astral anchovy, is a species of anchovy in the family Engraulidae. It is currently known only from estuarine habitats around Babeldaob Island, Palau. The species was formally described in 2024 by Harutaka Hata and Hiroyuki Motomura based on 17 specimens collected from mangrove‑influenced coastal waters.

== Taxonomy ==
Stolephorus astrum was described in the Raffles Bulletin of Zoology in 2024. The holotype (CAS 230413) and paratypes were collected from shallow, turbid estuaries in Karamado Bay and Kamiyangaru Bay on Babeldaob Island. The species name astrum ("star") refers to the distinctive star‑like melanophore pattern on the pectoral fin rays.

== Description ==
Stolephorus astrum is a slender, laterally compressed anchovy reaching at least 54.8 mm standard length. Key diagnostic characters include: Short maxilla reaching to or slightly beyond the anterior margin of the preopercle, 1–4 prepelvic scutes and no predorsal or postpelvic scutes, Dorsal fin with 3 unbranched and 12–14 branched rays, Anal fin with 3 unbranched and 18–19 branched rays, High gill‑raker counts, especially on the first arch (50–56 total), Melanophores on the 2nd–8th uppermost pectoral‑fin rays, forming the "astral" pattern, Slender body (16.8–19.0% SL) and relatively long caudal peduncle.

Preserved specimens are pale with a faint longitudinal band and paired dark patches on the parietal and occipital regions. Fresh coloration is unknown.

== Distribution and habitat ==
The species is known only from Babeldaob Island, Palau, where all specimens were collected in shallow, muddy estuarine waters influenced by mangroves and river outflow. Depths ranged from approximately 0.6 to 15 m.

== Comparisons ==
Stolephorus astrum belongs to a group of congeners with short maxillae and high gill‑raker counts, including Stolephorus leopardus, Stolephorus pacificus, and Stolephorus teguhi. It differs from these species in combinations of: Lower total gill‑raker counts, Narrower body proportions, Shorter predorsal‑fin length, Longer caudal peduncle, Presence of melanophores on pectoral‑fin rays (vs. absent in StolephorusS. pacificus), Absence of dark dorsal lines (present in Stolephorus leopardus and Stolephorus teguhi).

These distinctions are supported by meristic and morphometric analyses presented in the original description.

== Etymology ==
The specific epithet astrum (Latin: "star") refers to the star‑like pattern of black melanophores on the upper pectoral‑fin rays.
