= List of common commercial fish of Sri Lanka =

Sri Lanka is a tropical island situated close to the southern tip of India. It is situated in the middle of Indian Ocean. Because of being an island, Sri Lanka has many endemic freshwater fauna, as well as thousands of marine and brackish water fauna. Fishing is the way of life of most of coastal community. So, the marine fish fauna gives a greater commercial value to the country's economy, as well as well being of the coastal people.

Marine fish are strictly different from freshwater counterparts due to high salinity of sea water, which they live. Also, they are larger than most freshwater species and rich in proteins.

There are about 100+ species of common commercial fish around the country. Crustaceans such as, crabs, lobsters, prawns, and squids, cuttlefish, and sea cucumbers also added to this list instead of fish types due to their high value commercially.

== Cartilage fish ==
Class: Chondrichthyes

=== Mackerel sharks ===
Order: Lamniformes. Family: Lamnidae

Name	Binomial	Sinhala Name	Tamil Name
Longfin mako shark	Isurus paucus	Maha mee moraa (මහ මී මෝරා)	
Shortfin mako shark	Isurus oxyrinchus	Heen mee mora (හීන් මී මෝරා)	

=== Threshers ===
Family: Alopiidae

Name	Binomial	Sinhala Name	Tamil Name
Common thresher	Alopias vulpinus	Kasa moraa (කස මෝරා) - banned	

=== Requiem sharks ===
Family: Carcharhinidae

Name	Binomial	Sinhala Name	Tamil Name
Silky shark	Carcharhinus falciformis	Bala moraa (බල මෝරා)	
Oceanic whitetip shark	Carcharhinus longimanus	Polkola mora (පොල්කොල මෝරා)	
Blue shark	Prionace glauca	Seeni mora (සීනි මෝරා)	

=== Hammerhead sharks ===
Family: Sphyrnidae

Name	Binomial	Sinhala Name	Tamil Name
Scalloped hammerhead	Sphyrna lewini	Udalu mora (උදලු මෝරා)	
Great hammerhead	Sphyrna mokarran	Udalu mora (උදලු මෝරා)	
Smooth hammerhead	Sphyrna zygaena	Udalu mora (උදලු මෝරා)	

=== Guitarfish ===
Order: Rajiformes. Family: Rhinobatidae

Name	Binomial	Sinhala Name	Tamil Name
Common shovelnose ray	Glaucostegus typus	Baaloliyaa (බාලොලියා)	

=== Stingrays ===
Order: Myliobatiformes. Family: Dasyatidae

Name	Binomial	Sinhala Name	Tamil Name
Common stingray	Dasyatis pastinaca	Waeli maduwaa (වැලි මඩුවා)	
Pale-edged stingray	Dasyatis zugei	Waeli maduwaa (වැලි මඩුවා)	

=== Rays ===
Family: Myliobatidae

Name	Binomial	Sinhala Name	Tamil Name
Spotted eagle ray	Aetobatus narinari	Vavoi maduwaa (වවොයි මඩුවා)	
Pygmy devil ray	Mobula eregoodootenkee	Ali maduwaa (අලි මඩුවා)	
Flapnose ray	Rhinoptera javanica	Maduwaa (මඩුවා)	

=== Numbfish ===
Order: Torpediniformes. Family: Narcinidae

Name	Binomial	Sinhala Name	Tamil Name
Blackspotted numbfish	Narcine timlei	Viduli maduwaa (විදුලි මඩුවා)	

== Bony fish ==
Class: Actinopterygii

=== Scombrid fish ===
Order: Perciformes. Family: Scombridae

Name	Binomial	Sinhala Name	Tamil Name
Wahoo	Acanthocybium solandri	Sawaraa (සවරා)	
Bullet tuna	Auxis rochei	Ragodu, Kombayaa (රගොඩු, කොම්බයා)	
Frigate tuna	Auxis thazard	Alagoduwaa (අලගොඩුවා)	
Mackerel tuna	Euthynnus affinis	Aetawallaa (ඇටවල්ලා)	
Skipjack tuna	Katsuwonus pelamis	Balayaa (බලයා)	
Indian mackerel	Rastrelliger kanagurta	Kumbalawaa (කුම්බලවා)	
Narrow-barred Spanish mackerel	Scomberomorus commerson	Thoraa (තෝරා)	
Yellowfin tuna	Thunnus albacares	Kelawallaa (කෙලවල්ලා)	
Bigeye tuna	Thunnus obesus	As-gedi Kelawallaa (ඇස් ගෙඩි කෙලවල්ලා)	

=== Jacks and allies ===
Family: Carangidae

Common name	Binomial	Sinhala Name	Tamil Name
Bludger	Carangoides gymnostethus	Vattiyaa (වට්ටියා)	
Yellowspotted trevally	Carangoides fulvoguttatus	Thumba parau (තුම්බ පරාවා)	
Blacktip trevally	Caranx heberi	Guru parau (ගුරු පරාවා)	
Giant trevally	Caranx ignobilis	Parau (පරාවා)	
Indian Scad	Decapterus russelli	Linna (ලින්නා)	
Bigeye scad	Selar crumenophthalmus	Bollaa (බෝල්ලා)	

=== Sailfish and allies ===
Family: Istiophoridae

Common name	Binomial	Sinhala Name	Tamil Name
Indo-Pacific sailfish	Istiophorus platypterus	Thalapath (තලපත්)	
Black marlin	Istiompax indica	Kalu kopparaa (කලු කොප්පරා)	
Striped marlin	Kajikia audax	Iri kopparaa (ඉරි කොප්පරා)	
Atlantic blue marlin	Makaira nigricans	Nil koppara (නිල් කොප්පරා)	

=== Swordfish ===
Family: Xiphiidae

Common name	Binomial	Sinhala Name
Swordfish	Xiphias gladius	Sapparaa (සප්පරා)/Thalapath (තලපතා)

=== Emperors ===
Family: Lethrinidae

Common name	Binomial	Sinhala Name	Tamil Name
Spangled emperor	Lethrinus nebulosus	Meevetiya, Atissaa (මීවෙටියා, අටිස්සා)	
Longface emperor	Lethrinus olivaceus	Uru hotaa (ඌරු හොටා)	

=== Snappers ===
Family: Lutjanidae

Common name	Binomial	Sinhala Name
Sharptooth jobfish	Pristipomoides typus	Kalmaee (කලමී)
Mangrove red snapper	Lutjanus argentimaculatus	Thabalayaa (තබලයා)
Dory snapper	Lutjanus fulviflamma	Rannaa (රන්නා)
Blubberlip snapper	Lutjanus rivulatus	Badawaa (බඩවා)

=== Groupers ===
Family: Serranidae

Common name	Binomial	Sinhala Name
Coral hind	Cephalopholis miniata	Thabuwaa (තබුවා)
Malabar grouper	Epinephelus malabaricus	Gas bola, Gal kossaa (ගස් බෝලා, ගල් කොස්සා)
Wavy-lined grouper	Epinephelus undulosus	Lawayaa (ලවයා)

=== Sweetlips ===
Family: Haemulidae

Common name	Binomial	Sinhala Name
Sri Lanka sweetlips	Plectorhinchus ceylonensis	Boraluwaa (බොරලුවා)

=== Threadfin bream ===
Family: Nemipteridae

Common name	Binomial	Sinhala Name
Delagoa threadfin bream	Nemipterus bipunctatus	Sudhdhaa (සුද්දා)
Fork-tailed threadfin bream	Nemipterus furcosus	Sudhdhaa (සුද්දා)

=== Parrotfish ===
Family: Scaridae

Common name	Binomial	Sinhala Name
Ember parrotfish	Scarus rubroviolaceus	Girawaa (ගිරවා)
Eclipse parrotfish	Scarus russelii	Girawaa (ගිරවා)

=== Rabbitfish ===
Family: Siganidae

Common name	Binomial	Sinhala Name
Bronze-lined rabbitfish	Siganus insomnis	Orawaa (ඔරවා)
Streaked spinefoot	Siganus javus	Orawaa (ඔරවා)
Golden-lined spinefoot	Siganus lineatus	Orawaa (ඔරවා)
Vermiculated spinefoot	Siganus vermiculatus	Orawaa (ඔරවා)

=== Barracudas ===
Family: Sphyraenidae

Common name	Binomial	Sinhala Name
Pickhandle barracuda	Sphyraena jello	Jeelawaa (ජීලාවා)
Obtuse barracuda	Sphyraena obtusata	Jeelawaa (ජීලාවා)

=== Mullets ===
Family: Mugilidae

Common name	Binomial	Sinhala Name
Largescale mullet	Chelone macrolepis	Godayaa (ගොඩයා)
Flathead grey mullet	Mugil cephalus	Godayaa (ගොඩයා)

=== Cutlassfish ===
Family: Trichiuridae

Common name	Binomial	Sinhala Name
Savalani hairtail	Lepturacanthus savala	Sevalayaa (සෙවලයා)

=== Mojarras ===
Family: Gerreidae

Common name	Binomial	Sinhala Name
Deep-bodied mojarra	Gerres erythrourus	Thirali (තිරලි))
Slender silver-biddy	Gerres oblongus	Thirali (තිරලි)
Common silver-biddy	Gerres oyena	Thirali (තිරලි)

=== Ponyfish ===
Family: Leiognathidae

Common name	Binomial	Sinhala Name
Berber ponyfish	Leiognathus berbis	Kaarallaa (කාරල්ලා))
Shortnose ponyfish	Leiognathus brevirostris	Kaarallaa (කාරල්ලා)
Common ponyfish	Leiognathus equulus	Kaarallaa (කාරල්ලා)

=== Herrings and allies ===
Order: Clupeiformes. Family: Clupeidae

Name	Binomial	Sinhala Name
Bleeker's smoothbelly sardinella	Amblygaster clupeoides	Gal hurulla (ගල් හුරුල්ලා)
Smoothbelly sardinella	Amblygaster leiogaster	Keeramin (කීරමින්)
Spotted sardinella	Amblygaster sirm	Hurulla (හුරුල්ලා)
Rainbow sardine	Dussumieria acuta	Thondayaa (තොන්ඩයා)
White sardine	Escualosa thoracata	Wella sudaa (වැල්ල සුදා)
Bloch's gizzard shad	Nematalosa nasus	Koyyaa (කොය්යා)
White sardinella	Sardinella albella	Sudayaa (සුදයා)
Goldstripe sardinella	Sardinella gibbosa	Saalayaa (සාලයා)
Ilish	Tenualosa ilisha	Puvaali (පුවාලි)

=== Anchovy ===
Family: Engraulidae

Name	Binomial	Sinhala Name
Commerson's anchovy	Stolephorus commersonnii	Haalmassaa (හාල්මැස්සා)
Indian anchovy	Stolephorus indicus	Handalla (හැදැල්ලා)
False baelama anchovy	Thryssa encrasicholoides	Laggaa (ලග්ගා)
Gautama thryssa	Thryssa gautamiensis	Laggaa (ලග්ගා)
Malabar thryssa	Thryssa malabarica	Laggaa (ලග්ගා)/ Balal parattaya (බළල් පරට්ටයා)
Moustached thryssa	Thryssa mystax	Ata Laggaa (ඇට ලග්ගා)

=== Garfish ===
Order: Beloniformes. Family: Belonidae

Name	Binomial	Sinhala Name
Freshwater garfish	Xenentodon cancila	Habarali (හබරලි)

=== Flying fish ===
Family: Exocoetidae

Name	Binomial	Sinhala Name
Black-sail flyingfish	Cheilopogon nigricans	Piyamassa (පියාමැස්සා)

=== Halfbeaks ===
Family: Hemiramphidae

Name	Binomial	Sinhala Name
Jumping halfbeak	Hemiramphus archipelagicus	Morallaa (මොරල්ලා)
Congaturi halfbeak	Hyporhamphus limbatus	Morallaa (මොරල්ලා)

=== River garfish ===
Family: Zenarchopteridae

Name	Binomial	Sinhala Name
Feathered river garfish	Zenarchopterus dispar	Habarali (හබරලි)

== Crustaceans ==
Class: Malacostraca
Order: Decapoda

Family: Palaemonidae

Name	Binomial	Sinhala Name
Giant river prawn	Macrobrachium rosenbergii	Karadu issaa (කරඩු ඉස්සා)

Family: Penaeidae

Name	Binomial	Sinhala Name
Indian prawn	Fenneropenaeus indicus - syn. Penaeus indicus	Kiri issaa (කිරි ඉස්සා)
Asian tiger shrimp	Penaeus monodon	Karawadu issaa (කරවදු ඉස්සා)
Green tiger prawn	Penaeus semisulcatus	Kurutu issaa (කුරු‍ටු ඉස්සා)

Family: Palinuridae

Name	Binomial	Sinhala Name
Scalloped spiny lobster	Panulirus homarus	Waeli issaa (වැලි ඉස්සා)
Ornate rock lobster	Panulirus ornatus	Devi issaa (දෙවි ඉස්සා)
Pronghorn spiny lobster	Panulirus penicillatus	Gal issaa (ගල් ඉස්සා)
Slipper lobster	Panulirus polyphagus	Mada issaa (මඩ ඉස්සා)
Painted rock lobster	Panulirus versicolor	Bathik issaa (බතික් ඉස්සා)

Family: Scyllaridae

Name	Binomial	Sinhala Name
Slipper lobster	Bathyarctus rubens - syn. Scyllarus rubens	Sapaththu issaa (සපත්තු ඉස්සා)
Pygmy slipper lobster	Biarctus sordidus - syn. Scyllarus sordidus	Sapaththu issaa (සපත්තු ඉස්සා)

Order: Stomatopoda
Family: Odontodactylidae

Name	Binomial	Sinhala Name
Peacock mantis shrimp	Odontodactylus scyllarus - very few used as a food. mostly as an aquarium species.	Monara issaa (මොණර ඉස්සා)

Family: Portunidae

Name	Binomial	Sinhala Name
Smooth-shelled swimming crab	Charybdis affinis	Mudu kakuluwaa (මුදු කකුලුවා)
Crucifix crab	Charybdis feriata	Mudu kakuluwaa (මුදු කකුලුවා)
Indo Pacific swimming crab	Charybdis hellerii	Mudu kakuluwaa (මුදු කකුලුවා)
Ridged swimming crab	Charybdis natator	Mudu kakuluwaa (මුදු කකුලුවා)
Indian swimming crab	Charybdis smithii	Mudu kakuluwaa (මුදු කකුලුවා)
Blunt-toothed crab	Charybdis truncata	Mudu kakuluwaa (මුදු කකුලුවා)
Flower crab	Portunus pelagicus	Mal kakuluwaa (මල් කකුලුවා)
Three-spot swimming crab	Portunus sanguinolentus	Mudu kakuluwaa (මුදු කකුලුවා)
Mangrove crab	Scylla serrata	Kalapu kakuluwaa (කලපු කකුලුවා)

== Molluscs ==
Class: Cephalopoda
Order: Teuthida

Family: Loliginidae

Name	Binomial	Sinhala Name
Indian squid	Uroteuthis duvauceli - syn. Loligo duvauceli	Ahin daellaa (අහින් දැල්ලා)
Long barrel squid	Uroteuthis singhalensis - syn. Loligo singhalensis	Bothal daellaa (බෝතල් දැල්ලා)

Order: Sepiida
Family: Sepiidae

Name	Binomial	Sinhala Name	Tamil Name
Needle cuttlefish	Sepia aculeata	Pothu daellaa (පොතු දැල්ලා)	Oosi Kanawa (ஊசி கணவாய்)
Pharaoh cuttlefish	Sepia pharaonis	Daellaa (දැල්ලා)	Kanawa (கணவாய்)

== Echinoderms ==
Class: Holothuroidea

Order: Holothuriida
Family: Holothuriidae

Name	Binomial	Sinhala Name
Harry blackfish	Actinopyga miliaris	Kalu attayaa (කලු අට්ටයා)
Brown sandfish	Bohadschia marmorata	Nul attayaa (නූල් අට්ටයා)
Lollyfish	Holothuria atra	Nari attayaa (නරි අට්ටයා)
Edible sea cucumber	Holothuria edulis	Rathu attayaa (රතු අට්ටයා)
White Teatfish	Holothuria fuscogilva	Ham attayaa (හම් අට්ටයා)
Black Teatfish	Holothuria nobilis	Polon attayaa (පොලොන් අට්ටයා)
Golden Sandfish	Holothuria scabra	Waeli attayaa (වැලි අට්ටයා)

Order: Synallactida
Family: Stichopodidae

Name	Binomial	Sinhala Name
Greenfish sea cucumber	Stichopus chloronotus	Dambalayaa (දබලයා)
Pineapple sea cucumber	Thelenota ananas	Annaasi attayaa (අන්නාසි අට්ටයා)
Giant sea cucumber	Thelenota anax	Pun attayaa (පන් අට්ටයා)
