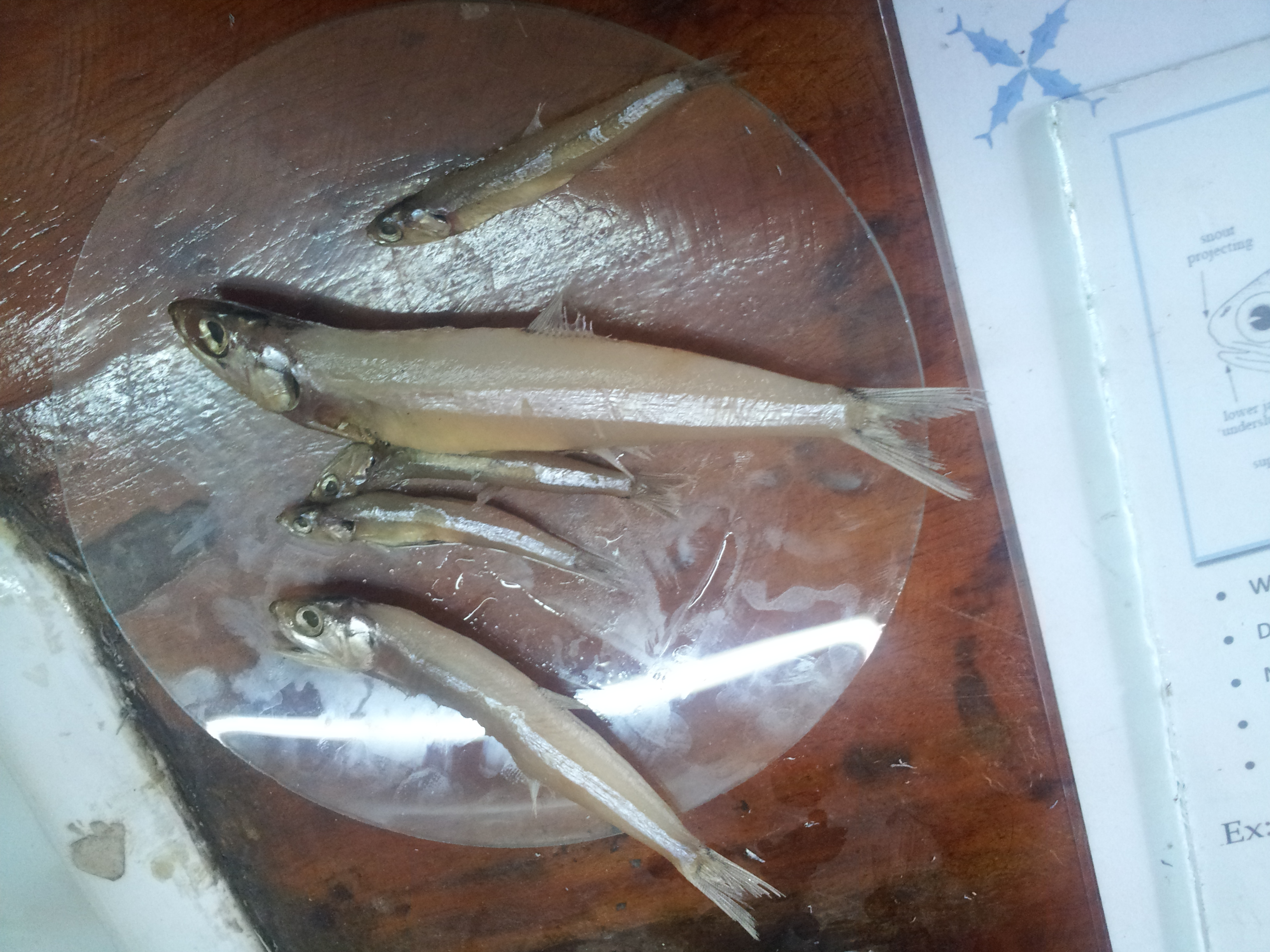
- Stolephorus indicus (larger specimens) with Commerson's anchovy (smaller specimens)

Conservation status
- Least Concern (IUCN 3.1)

Scientific classification
- Kingdom: Animalia
- Phylum: Chordata
- Class: Actinopterygii
- Order: Clupeiformes
- Family: Engraulidae
- Genus: Stolephorus
- Species: S. commersonnii

Binomial name
- Stolephorus commersonnii Lacépède, 1803

Synonyms
- Anchovia commersoniana (Lacepède, 1803); Anchoviella commersonii (Lacepède, 1803); Stolephorus commerrianus Lacepède, 1803; Stolephorus commerson Lacepède, 1803; Stolephorus commersoni Lacepède, 1803; Stolephorus commersonianus Lacepède, 1803; Stolephorus commersonii Lacepède, 1803; Clupea tuberculosa Lacepède, 1803; Stolephorus rex Jordan & Seale, 1926; Anchoviella indica (non Hasselt, 1823) misapplied; Stolephorus indicus (non Hasselt, 1823) misapplied; Anchoviella holodon (non Boulenger, 1900) misapplied; Stolephorus holodon (non Boulenger, 1900) misapplied

= Stolephorus commersonnii =

Commerson's anchovy

Species of ray-finned fish

Commerson's anchovy (Stolephorus commersonnii), also known as Devis's anchovy, long-jawed anchovy, Teri anchovy, is a species of anadromous ray-finned fish in the family Engraulidae. It is known as haalmassa in Sri Lanka, where it is widely used as a nutrient-rich fish meat. It is widely used as a live or dead bait in tuna fishery.

== Description ==
It is a small schooling fish found in depth of 0–50 m in most of the tropical areas of the Indo-Pacific oceans, including Madagascar and Mauritius eastward and towards Hong Kong and further east to Papua New Guinea in westwards. Maximum standard length is 11.2 cm. It has 21–22 anal soft rays. There are 0–5 small needle-like scutes on the belly region. Belly is slightly rounded. Body color is same as other engraulids, where body is light transparent fleshy brown with a pair of dark patches behind occiput, followed by a pair of lines to dorsal fin origin. The silver stripe is present on flanks.

== Ecology ==
Indian anchovy usually feeds on surface plankton. Female lay oval eggs in grassy sea beds.

== Human use ==
This fish, with the much larger Indian anchovy, is part of the cuisine of the South- and Southeast Asian marine regions. It can be crisp-fried, used to make fish-based culinary products like fish sauce or in curries. In Sri Lanka, this variety of fish is made into a tasty snack by dipping in a batter of flour, then rolled in bread crumbs and deep fried in oil. It is also popular as a 'white curry', i.e.a curry made with coconut milk. A spicier variant is made with dry chilli gravy and served with scraped fresh coconut to offset the hotness of the gravy.

== Vernacular names ==
Commerson's anchovy is known as:

- Dilis in Filipino
- Haalmassa (හාල්මැස්සා) in Sinhala
- Netthallu (నెత్తళ్ళు) in Telugu
- Ikan Bilis in Malay language

== See also ==
- List of fish in India
- List of marine bony fishes of South Africa
- List of common commercial fish of Sri Lanka
