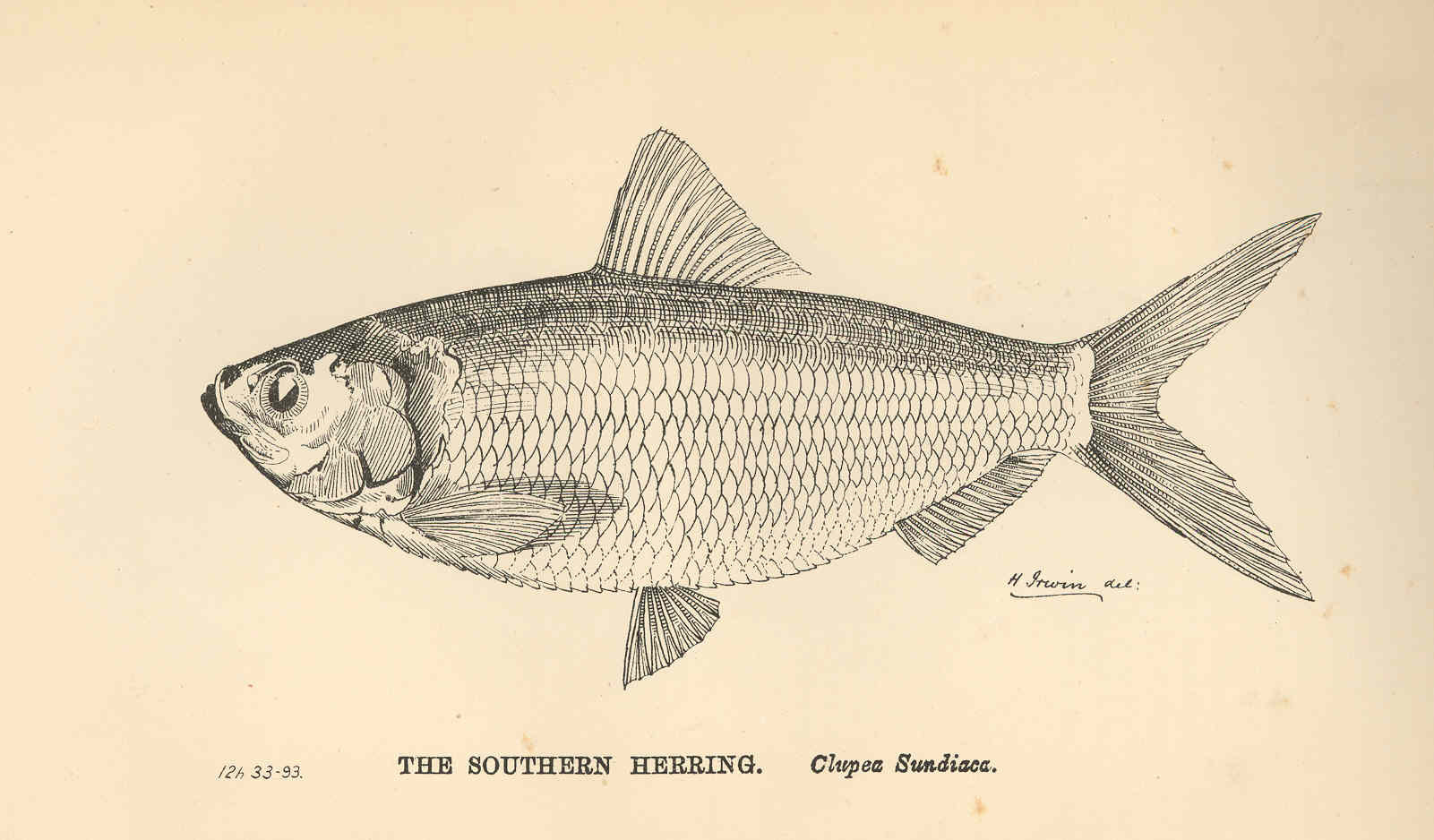

Conservation status
- Least Concern (IUCN 3.1)

Scientific classification
- Kingdom: Animalia
- Phylum: Chordata
- Class: Actinopterygii
- Order: Clupeiformes
- Family: Dorosomatidae
- Genus: Sardinella
- Species: S. albella

Binomial name
- Sardinella albella (Valenciennes, 1847)

Synonyms
- Kowala albella Valenciennes, 1847; Clupalosa bulan Bleeker, 1849; Clupea bulan (Bleeker, 1849); Harengula bulan (Bleeker, 1849); Sardinella bulan (Bleeker, 1849); Clupeonia perforata Cantor, 1849; Clupea perforata (Cantor, 1849); Harengula perforata (Cantor, 1849); Sardinella perforata (Cantor, 1849); Clupea perforate (Cantor, 1849); Kowala lauta Cantor, 1849; Spratella kowala Bleeker, 1851; Clupea sundaica Bleeker, 1851; Harengula dollfusi Chabanaud, 1933; Sardinella melanura (non Cuvier, 1829) misapplied; Sardinella zunasi (non Bleeker, 1854) misapplied; Clupea hypelosoma (non Bleeker, 1866) misapplied

= Sardinella albella =

White sardinella

Species of fish

The white sardinella (Sardinella albella), also known as deep-bodied sardine, perforated-scale sardine or short-bodied sardine, is a species of ray-finned fish in the genus Sardinella. It is an important food fish, which can be feed as dried, salted, or fresh forms.

== Description ==
It is distributed throughout the Indo-West Pacific oceans from Madagascar, around India, Sri Lanka, and eastward to Indonesia, Taiwan and south to Papua New Guinea.

It is a small schooling fish found in depth of 20-50m. Maximum length do not exceed 21.5 cm. The fish has 13 to 21 dorsal soft rays and 12 to 23 anal soft rays. There is a dark spot at origin part of dorsal fin. It feeds on small planktons.

== See also ==
- List of common commercial fish of Sri Lanka
