= Stolephorus waitei =

Spotty-face anchovy

Conservation status
- Data Deficient (IUCN 3.1)

Scientific classification
- Kingdom: Animalia
- Phylum: Chordata
- Class: Actinopterygii
- Order: Clupeiformes
- Family: Engraulidae
- Genus: Stolephorus
- Species: S. waitei

Binomial name
- Stolephorus waitei D. S. Jordan & Seale, 1926

Synonyms
- Anchovia apiensis Jordan & Seale, 1906

Species of fish

Stolephorus waitei, the spotty-face anchovy, is a species of ray-finned fish in the family Engraulidae. It is found in the Indo-Pacific.

== Size ==
This species reaches a length of 9.4 cm (3.7 in).

== Etymology ==
The fish is named in honor of Australian zoologist and museum director Edgar R. Waite (1866–1928).
