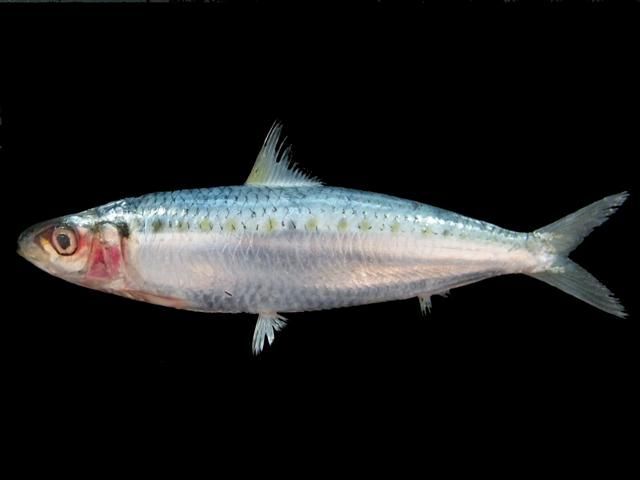

Conservation status
- Least Concern (IUCN 3.1)

Scientific classification
- Kingdom: Animalia
- Phylum: Chordata
- Class: Actinopterygii
- Order: Clupeiformes
- Family: Dorosomatidae
- Genus: Amblygaster
- Species: A. sirm

Binomial name
- Amblygaster sirm (Walbaum, 1792)

Synonyms
- Clupea harengus sirm Walbaum, 1792; Clupea sirm Walbaum, 1792; Sardinella sirm (Walbaum, 1792); Ambligaster sirm Walbaum, 1792; Sardinella leiogastroides Bleeker, 1854; Clupea pinguis Günther, 1872; Sardinops dakini Whitley, 1937

= Amblygaster sirm =

Spotted sardinella

Species of fish

Amblygaster sirm, the spotted sardinella, also known as the northern pilchard, spotted pilchard, spotted sardine, and trenched sardine, is a reef-associated marine species of sardinellas in the herring family Clupeidae.

== Location ==
It is one of the three species of genus Amblygaster. It is found in the marine waters along Indo-West Pacific regions from Mozambique to the Philippines, and towards north Taiwan and Japan to the far east of Australia and Fiji.

== Appearance ==
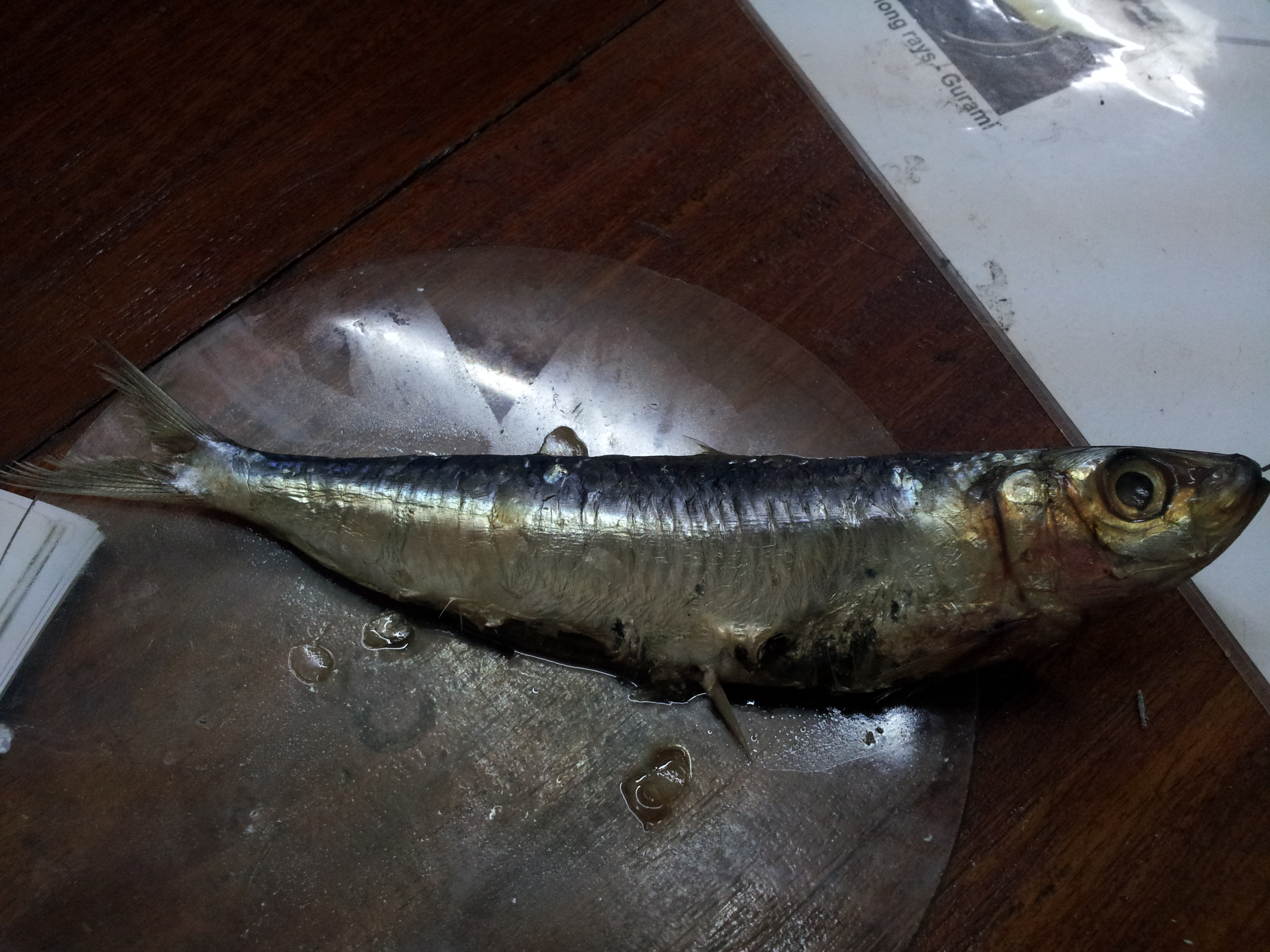
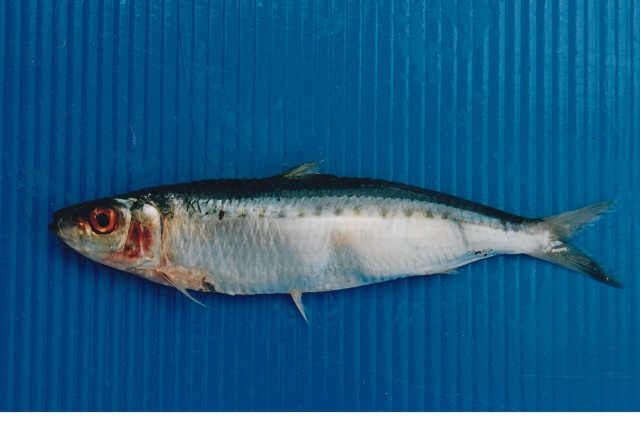
Live specimen with golden spots (left), spots becomes black after dead (right).

The fish has 13 to 21 dorsal soft rays and 12 to 23 anal soft rays. It grows up to a maximum total length of 27 cm (11 in). The distinctive feature of spotted sardinella from other two relatives is the presence of 10 to 20 golden spots along the flank. The color of spots may change into black after preservation. Belly is less rounded and scutes are not prominent.

== Diet ==
The fish feeds on minute organisms like copepods, larval bivalves and aquatic gastropods, and dinoflagellates like Peridinium and Ceratium.

== Human uses ==
The fish is present in fisheries throughout its range. It is often used as bait. It is a widely captured commercial fish in Sri Lanka, where the fish is known as "Hurulla" in Sinhala language.

== See also ==
- Amblygaster clupeoides
- Amblygaster leiogaster
- Commercial fish of Sri Lanka
