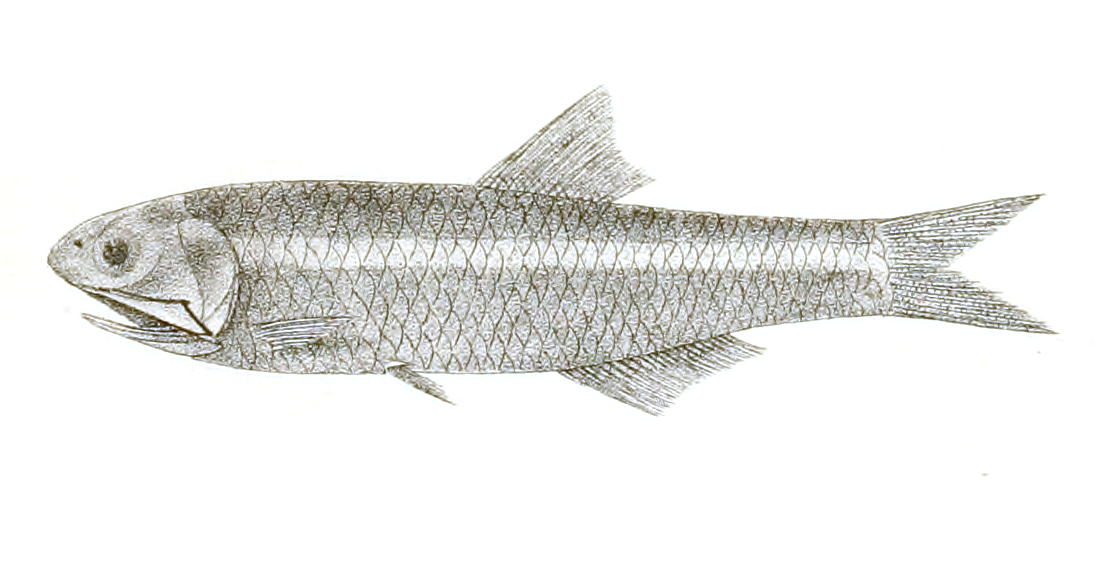

Conservation status
- Data Deficient (IUCN 3.1)

Scientific classification
- Kingdom: Animalia
- Phylum: Chordata
- Class: Actinopterygii
- Order: Clupeiformes
- Family: Engraulidae
- Genus: Stolephorus
- Species: S. tri

Binomial name
- Stolephorus tri (Bleeker, 1852)

Synonyms
- List: Engraulis tri Bleeker, 1852; Anchoviella tri (Bleeker, 1852); Stolephorus insularis Hardenberg, 1931; Stolephorus baganensis megalops Delsman 1931; Stolephorus baganensis Delsman 1931; Stolephorus baganensis macrops Hardenberg 1933

= Stolephorus tri =

Spined anchovy

Species of fish

Stolephorus tri, the spined anchovy, is a species of ray-finned fish in the family Engraulidae. It is found in the western Pacific Ocean.

== Size ==
This species reaches a length of 9.5 cm (3.7 in).
