= Stolephorus holodon =

Natal anchovy

Conservation status
- Least Concern (IUCN 3.1)

Scientific classification
- Kingdom: Animalia
- Phylum: Chordata
- Class: Actinopterygii
- Order: Clupeiformes
- Family: Engraulidae
- Genus: Stolephorus
- Species: S. holodon

Binomial name
- Stolephorus holodon ( Boulenger, 1900)

Synonyms
- Engraulis holodon Boulenger, 1900; Anchoviella holodon (Boulenger, 1900)

Species of fish

Stolephorus holodon, the Natal anchovy, is a species of ray-finned fish in the family Engraulidae. It is found in the Indian Ocean.

== Size ==
This species reaches a length of 8.0 cm (3.1 in).
