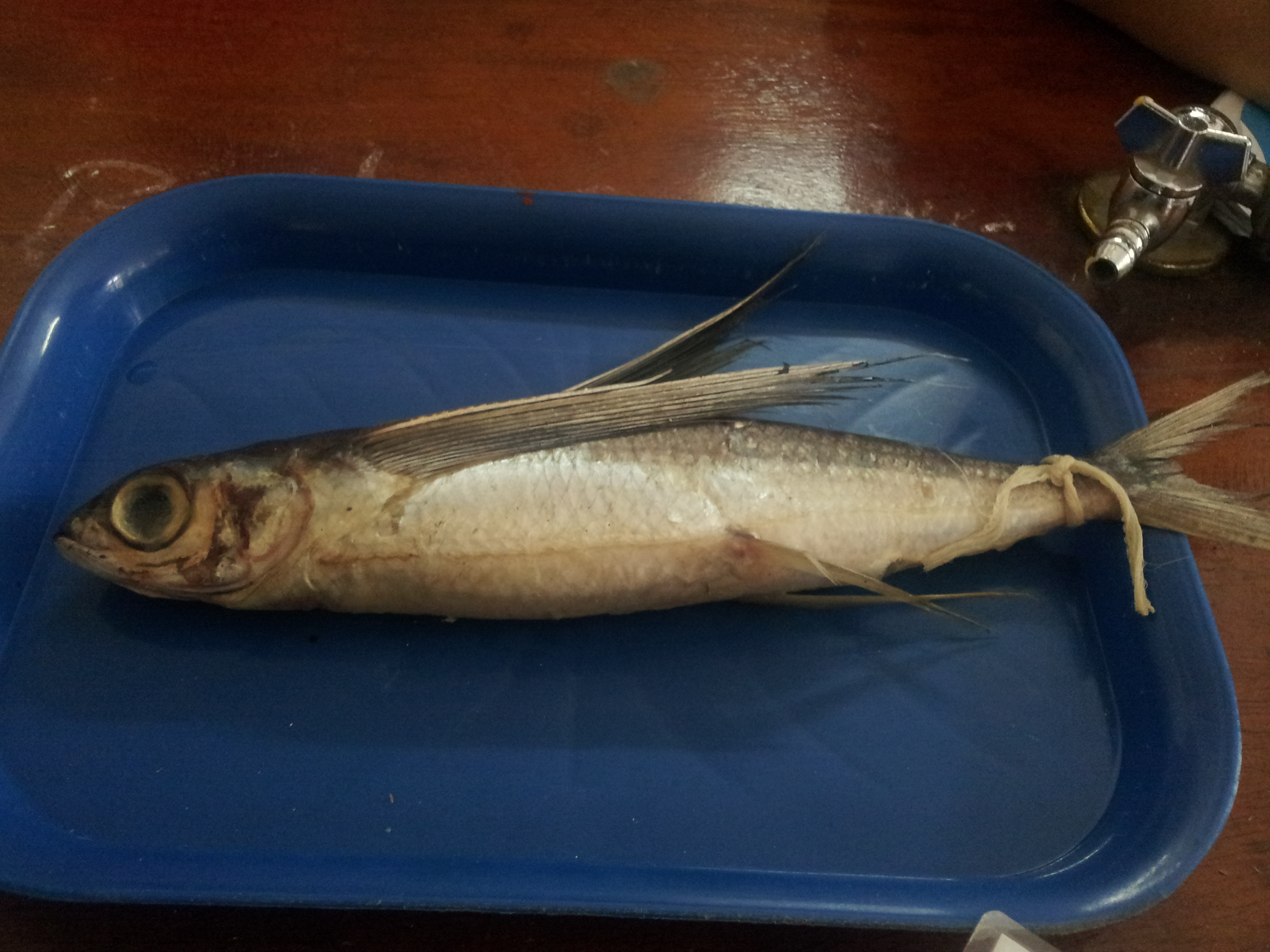
- preserved specimen from Sri Lanka

Conservation status
- Least Concern (IUCN 3.1)

Scientific classification
- Kingdom: Animalia
- Phylum: Chordata
- Class: Actinopterygii
- Order: Beloniformes
- Family: Exocoetidae
- Genus: Cheilopogon
- Species: C. nigricans

Binomial name
- Cheilopogon nigricans (Bennett, 1840)

Synonyms
- Exocaetus nigricans Bennett, 1840; Cypselurus nigricans (Bennett, 1840); Exocoetus nigricans Bennett, 1840; Cypselurus pinnatibarbatus (non Bennett, 1831) misapplied; Exocoetus spilopus (non Valenciennes, 1846) misapplied

= Cheilopogon nigricans =

Species of fish

Cheilopogon nigricans, the blacksail flyingfish, also known as African flyingfish, or leaping flyingfish, is a flying fish in the family Exocoetidae. It is an oceanodromous, plankton-eating marine fish which has commercial value.

== Description ==
Like many other flyingfishes, the blacksail flyingfish has a cylindrical body and large pectoral and pelvic fins that it uses for gliding flight. Most adults are roughly 28 cm long and are generally dark iridescent blue above, silvery white below. Pectoral fins are black and with a yellowish stripe in the middle. Pelvic fins have prominent black spot, which can clearly identify the species. Juveniles are different from the adults by the presence of dark bars on body. It has 13 to 15 dorsal soft rays and 8 to 11 anal soft rays.

== Distribution and habitat ==
The blacksail flyingfish is a widely spread fish that can be found tropical water of Indian, West Pacific and parts of Atlantic Oceans. It can be seen along Brazil, South Africa, Madagascar, Sri Lanka, India, Pakistan, Bangladesh, Sumatra, Indonesia, Japan, Taiwan, Fiji, Borneo, and Australia.

== See also ==
- List of common commercial fish of Sri Lanka
