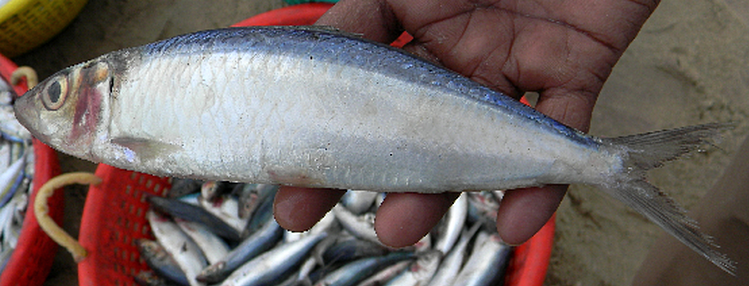

Scientific classification
- Domain: Eukaryota
- Kingdom: Animalia
- Phylum: Chordata
- Class: Actinopterygii
- Order: Clupeiformes
- Family: Dorosomatidae
- Genus: Amblygaster
- Species: A. clupeoides

Binomial name
- Amblygaster clupeoides Bleeker, 1849

Synonyms
- Clupea clupeoides (Bleeker, 1849); Sardinella clupeoides (Bleeker, 1849)

= Amblygaster clupeoides =

Species of fish

Amblygaster clupeoides, the Bleeker smoothbelly sardinella, blue pilchard, sharp-nosed pilchard, or sharpnose sardine, is a reef-associated marine species of sardinellas in the herring family Clupeidae. It is one of the three species of genus Amblygaster.

== Distribution ==
It is found in the marine waters along Indo-West Pacific regions.

== Description ==
The fish has 13 to 21 dorsal soft rays and 12 to 23 anal soft rays. It grows up to a maximum length of 21 cm. The flank is gold in fresh fish but becomes black while preservation. Belly is more rounded and scutes are not prominent.

== Diet ==
The fish feeds on minute organisms like copepods, Mysis and zooplankton. Widely used as bait in the tuna fishery all along the world, both as a live or dead forms.

== See also ==
- Amblygaster leiogaster
- Amblygaster sirm
- Commercial fish of Sri Lanka
