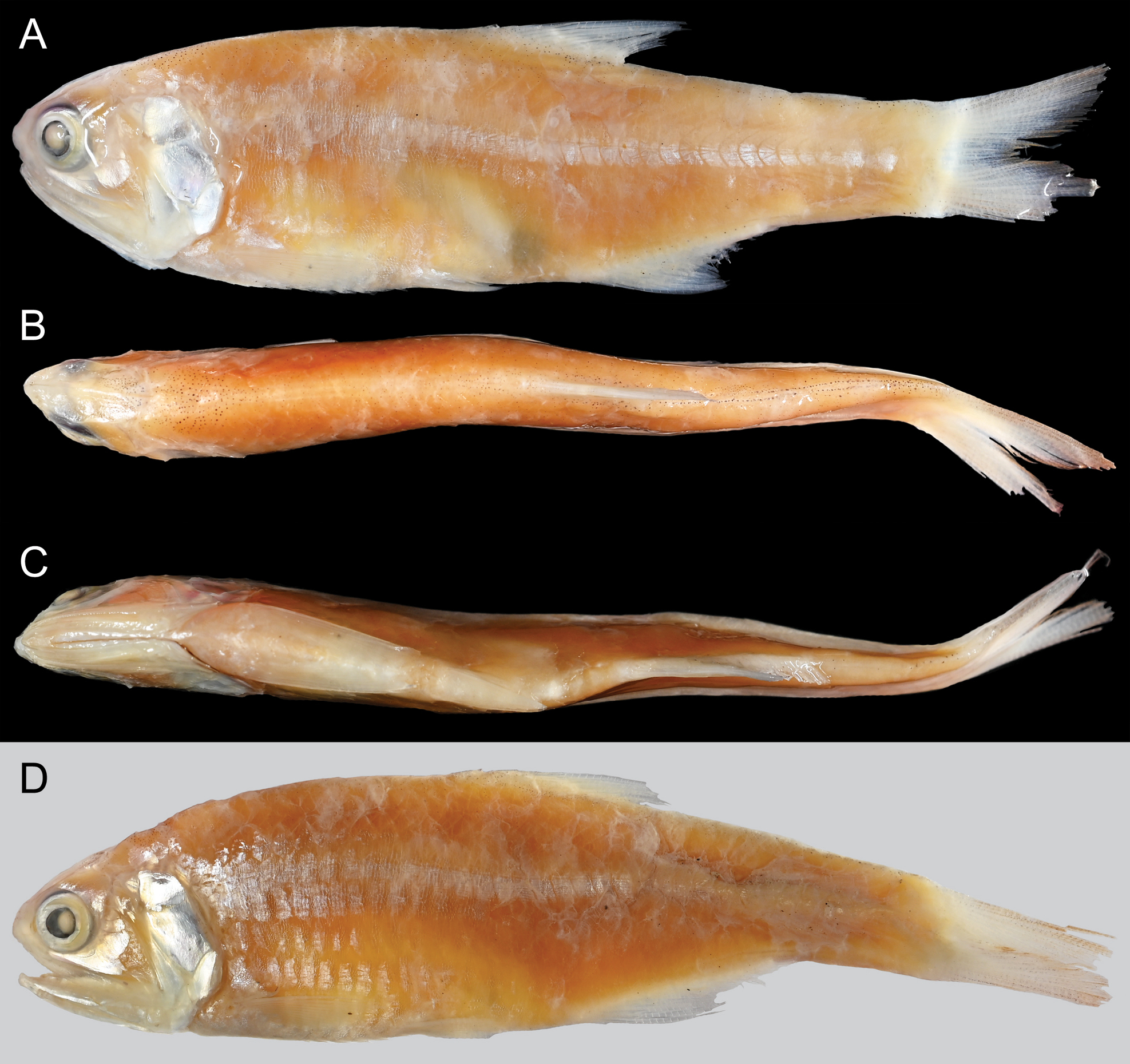
- Stolephorus falco

Scientific classification
- Kingdom: Animalia
- Phylum: Chordata
- Class: Actinopterygii
- Division: Teleostei
- Order: Clupeiformes
- Family: Engraulidae
- Subfamily: Engraulinae
- Genus: Stolephorus; Lacépède, 1803

Type species
- Stolephorus commersonnii Lacépède, 1803

Species
- See text

= Stolephorus =

Genus of ray-finned fishes

Stolephorus is a genus of ray-finned fish in the family Engraulidae. They are found in Atlantic and Indo-pacific

== Species ==
These are the currently recognized species in this genus:

- Stolephorus acinaces Hata & Lavoué & Motomura, 2020
- Stolephorus advenus Wongratana, 1987 (False Indian anchovy)
- Stolephorus andhraensis Babu Rao, 1966 (Andhra anchovy)
- Stolephorus apiensis (D. S. Jordan & Seale, 1906) (Samoan anchovy)
- Stolephorus astrum Hata & Motomura, 2024 (Astral Anchovy)
- Stolephorus babarani Hata, Lavoué & Motomura, 2020
- Stolephorus baganensis Hardenberg, 1933 (Bagan anchovy)
- Stolephorus balinensis (Bleeker, 1849)
- Stolephorus bataviensis Hardenberg, 1933
- Stolephorus baweanensis Hardenberg, 1933
- Stolephorus belaerius Hata, Lavoué & Motomura, 2021
- Stolephorus brachycephalus Wongratana, 1983 (Broadhead anchovy)
- Stolephorus brevis Hata & Motomura, 2024
- Stolephorus carpentariae (De Vis, 1882) (Gulf of Carpentaria anchovy)
- Stolephorus celsior Hata & Motomura, 2021
- Stolephorus chinensis (Günther, 1880) (China anchovy)
- Stolephorus commersonnii Lacépède, 1803 (Commerson's anchovy)
- Stolephorus concursus Hata & Motomura, 2021
- Stolephorus continentalis Hata & Motomura, 2018
- Stolephorus diabolus Hata, Lavoué & Motomura, 2022
- Stolephorus dubiosus Wongratana, 1983 (Thai anchovy)
- Stolephorus eclipsis Hata, Lavoué & Motomura, 2022
- Stolephorus eldorado Hata, Lavoué & Motomura, 2022
- Stolephorus falco Hata, Sallan & Motomura, 2026
- Stolephorus grandis Hata & Motomura, 2021
- Stolephorus hindustanensis Hata & Motomura, 2022
- Stolephorus holodon (Boulenger, 1900) (Natal anchovy)
- Stolephorus horizon Hata & Motomura, 2023
- Stolephorus indicus (van Hasselt, 1823) (Indian anchovy)
- Stolephorus insignus Hata & Motomura, 2018
- Stolephorus insularis Hardenberg, 1933 (Hardenberg's anchovy)
- Stolephorus leopardus Hata & Motomura, 2021
- Stolephorus lotus Hata & Motomura, 2022
- Stolephorus mercurius Hata, Lavoué & Motomura, 2021
- Stolephorus meteorum Hata, Lavoué, Bogorodsky, Alpermann & Motomura, 2023
- Stolephorus multibranchus Wongratana, 1987 (Caroline anchovy)
- Stolephorus nelsoni Wongratana, 1987 (Nelson's anchovy)
- Stolephorus pacificus W. J. Baldwin, 1984 (Pacific anchovy)
- Stolephorus rex Jordan & Seale, 1926
- Stolephorus ronquilloi Wongratana, 1983 (Ronquillo's anchovy)
- Stolephorus scitulus (Fowler, 1911)
- Stolephorus shantungensis (G. L. Li, 1978)
- Stolephorus tamilensis Gangan, Pavan-Kumar, Jahageerdar & Jaiswar, 2020
- Stolephorus taurus Hata, Lavoué & Motomura, 2022
- Stolephorus teguhi Seishi Kimura, K. Hori & Shibukawa, 2009 (Sulawesi anchovy)
- Stolephorus tri (Bleeker, 1852) (Spined anchovy)
- Stolephorus waitei D. S. Jordan & Seale, 1926 (Spotty-face anchovy)
- Stolephorus zephyrus Hata, Lavoué & Motomura, 2021
- Stolephorus zollingeri (Bleeker, 1849)
