= Stolephorus nelsoni =

Nelson's anchovy

Conservation status
- Data Deficient (IUCN 3.1)

Scientific classification
- Kingdom: Animalia
- Phylum: Chordata
- Class: Actinopterygii
- Order: Clupeiformes
- Family: Engraulidae
- Genus: Stolephorus
- Species: S. nelsoni

Binomial name
- Stolephorus nelsoni Wongratana, 1987

Species of fish

Stolephorus nelsoni, also known as Nelson's anchovy, is a species of ray-finned fish in the family Engraulidae. It is found in the eastern Indian Ocean.

== Size ==
This species reaches a length of 7.4 cm (2.9 in).

== Etymology ==
The fish is named in honor of Gareth J. Nelson (b. 1937), of the American Museum of Natural History, for his "knowledge and classic works on the comparative anatomy and cladistic relationships among clupeoid fishes," and for providing specimens of this species and suggesting that it might be an undescribed species.
