= Thryssa gautamiensis =

Gautama thryssa

Conservation status
- Data Deficient (IUCN 3.1)

Scientific classification
- Kingdom: Animalia
- Phylum: Chordata
- Class: Actinopterygii
- Order: Clupeiformes
- Family: Engraulidae
- Genus: Thryssa
- Species: T. gautamiensis

Binomial name
- Thryssa gautamiensis Babu Rao, 1971

Species of ray-finned fish

Thryssa gautamiensis, the gautama thryssa, is a species of amphidromous ray-finned fish in the family Engraulidae.

== Description ==
It is distributed throughout the eastern coast of India, around Sri Lanka, and possibly Myanmar. It is a small schooling fish found in depth of 20-50m. Maximum length does not exceed 21.5 cm (8.5 in). The fish lack dorsal soft rays and only present 34 to 37 anal soft rays.

== See also ==
- List of common commercial fish of Sri Lanka
