= Stolephorus chinensis =

China anchovy

Conservation status
- Least Concern (IUCN 3.1)

Scientific classification
- Kingdom: Animalia
- Phylum: Chordata
- Class: Actinopterygii
- Order: Clupeiformes
- Family: Engraulidae
- Genus: Stolephorus
- Species: S. chinensis

Binomial name
- Stolephorus chinensis (Günther, 1888)

Synonyms
- Engraulis chinensis Günther, 1880; Anchoviella chinensis (Günther, 1880)

Species of fish

Stolephorus chinensis, the China anchovy, is a species of ray-finned fish in the family Engraulidae. It is found in the western Pacific Ocean.

== Size ==
This species reaches a length of 9.0 cm (3.5 in).
