= Stolephorus brachycephalus =

Broadhead anchovy

Conservation status
- Least Concern (IUCN 3.1)

Scientific classification
- Kingdom: Animalia
- Phylum: Chordata
- Class: Actinopterygii
- Order: Clupeiformes
- Family: Engraulidae
- Genus: Stolephorus
- Species: S. brachycephalus

Binomial name
- Stolephorus brachycephalus Wongratana, 1987\

Species of fish

Stolephorus brachycephalus, the broadhead anchovy, is a species of ray-finned fish in the family Engraulidae. It is found in the western-central Pacific Ocean.

== Size ==
This species reaches a length of 4.2 cm (1.7 in).
