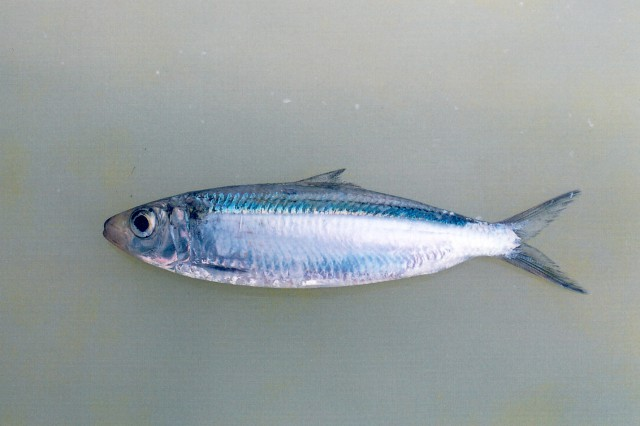

Conservation status
- Least Concern (IUCN 3.1)

Scientific classification
- Kingdom: Animalia
- Phylum: Chordata
- Class: Actinopterygii
- Order: Clupeiformes
- Family: Dorosomatidae
- Genus: Amblygaster
- Species: A. leiogaster

Binomial name
- Amblygaster leiogaster (Valenciennes, 1847)

Synonyms
- Sardinella leiogaster Valenciennes, 1847; Clupea leiogaster (Valenciennes, 1847); Amblyogaster leiogaster (Valenciennes, 1847); Clupea okinawensis Kishinouye, 1908

= Amblygaster leiogaster =

Species of fish

Amblygaster leiogaster, the smoothbelly sardinella, also known as blue sardine, blue sprat, bluebait, is a reef-associated marine species of sardinella in the herring family Clupeidae. It is one of the three species of genus Amblygaster. It is found in the marine waters along Indo-West Pacific regions south towards western Australia. The fish has 13 to 21 dorsal soft rays and 12 to 23 anal soft rays. It grows up to a maximum length of 23 cm. The flank is gold in fresh fish but becomes black while preservation. Belly is more rounded and scutes are not prominent. It is rather closely resemble Amblygaster clupeoides, but the latter has very few lower gill rakers than smoothbelly sardinella. The fish feeds on minute organisms like zooplankton.

== See also ==
- Amblygaster clupeoides
- Amblygaster sirm
- Commercial fish of Sri Lanka
