= Stolephorus multibranchus =

Caroline anchovy

Conservation status
- Data Deficient (IUCN 3.1)

Scientific classification
- Kingdom: Animalia
- Phylum: Chordata
- Class: Actinopterygii
- Order: Clupeiformes
- Family: Engraulidae
- Genus: Stolephorus
- Species: S. multibranchus

Binomial name
- Stolephorus multibranchus Wongratana, 1987

Species of fish

Stolephorus multibranchus, also known as Caroline anchovy, is a species of ray-finned fish in the family Engraulidae. It is found in the western-central Pacific Ocean.

== Size ==
This species reaches a length of 6.0 cm (2.4 in).
