= Stolephorus shantungensis =

False Indian anchovy

Conservation status
- Data Deficient (IUCN 3.1)

Scientific classification
- Kingdom: Animalia
- Phylum: Chordata
- Class: Actinopterygii
- Order: Clupeiformes
- Family: Engraulidae
- Genus: Stolephorus
- Species: S. shantungensis

Binomial name
- Stolephorus shantungensis (G. L. Li, 1978)

Synonyms
- Anchoviella shantungensis G. L. Li, 1978

Species of fish

Stolephorus shantungensis is a species of ray-finned fish in the family Engraulidae. It is found in the north-western Pacific Ocean.

== Size ==
This species reaches a length of 5.8 cm (2.3 in).
