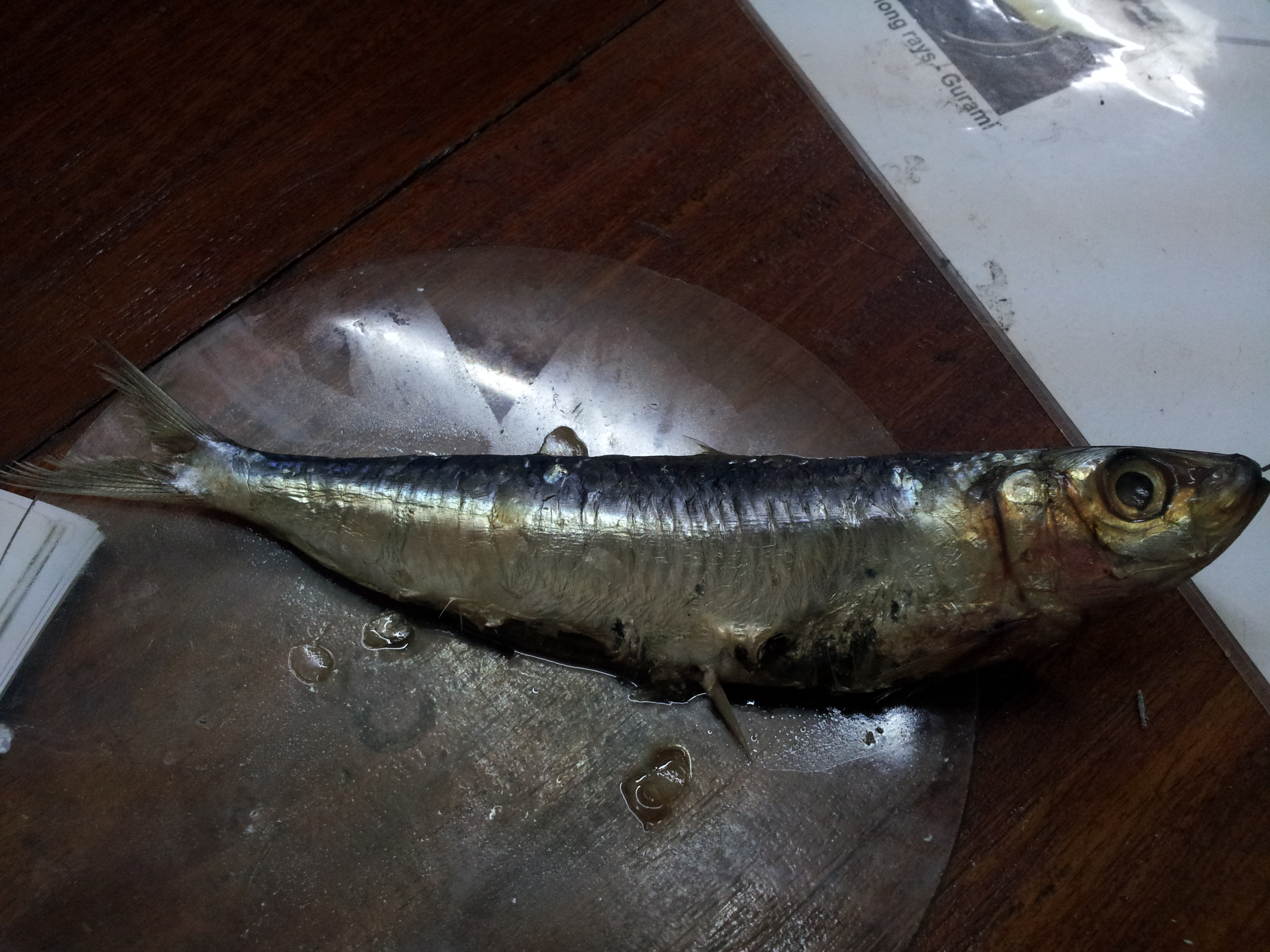
- A. sirm

Scientific classification
- Kingdom: Animalia
- Phylum: Chordata
- Class: Actinopterygii
- Order: Clupeiformes
- Family: Dorosomatidae
- Genus: Amblygaster; Bleeker, 1849

Type species
- Amblygaster clupeoides Bleeker, 1849

Synonyms
- Sardinops (Fusiclupea) Whitley, 1940

= Amblygaster =

Genus of fishes

Amblygaster is a small genus of sardinellas in the herring family Dorosomatidae. It currently contains four species. They are found in Indo-West Pacific regions.

== Species ==
- Amblygaster clupeoides Bleeker, 1849 (Bleeker's smoothbelly sardinella)
- Amblygaster indiana Mary, Balasubramanian, Selvaraju & Shiny, 2017
- Amblygaster leiogaster (Valenciennes, 1847) (Smoothbelly sardinella)
- Amblygaster sirm (Walbaum, 1792) (Spotted sardinella)
