= Stolephorus baganensis =

Bagan anchovy

Conservation status
- Least Concern (IUCN 3.1)

Scientific classification
- Kingdom: Animalia
- Phylum: Chordata
- Class: Actinopterygii
- Order: Clupeiformes
- Family: Engraulidae
- Genus: Stolephorus
- Species: S. baganensis

Binomial name
- Stolephorus baganensis Hardenberg, 1933

Species of fish

Stolephorus baganensis, the Bagan anchovy, is a species of ray-finned fish in the family Engraulidae. It is found in the Indo-Pacific.

== Size ==
This species reaches a length of 10.0 cm (3.9 in).
