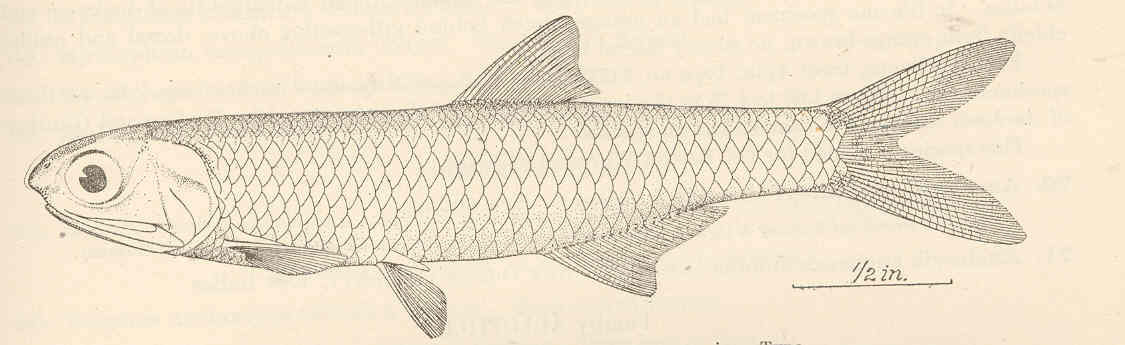

Conservation status
- Least Concern (IUCN 3.1)

Scientific classification
- Kingdom: Animalia
- Phylum: Chordata
- Class: Actinopterygii
- Order: Clupeiformes
- Family: Engraulidae
- Genus: Stolephorus
- Species: S. apiensis

Binomial name
- Stolephorus apiensis (D. S. Jordan & Seale, 1906)

Synonyms
- Anchovia apiensis Jordan & Seale, 1906

= Stolephorus apiensis =

Samoan anchovy

Species of fish

Stolephorus apiensis, the Samoan anchovy, is a species of ray-finned fish in the family Engraulidae. It is found in the western Pacific Ocean.

== Size ==
This species reaches a length of 6.0 cm (2.4 in).
