= Stolephorus carpentariae =

Gulf of Carpentaria anchovy

Conservation status
- Least Concern (IUCN 3.1)

Scientific classification
- Kingdom: Animalia
- Phylum: Chordata
- Class: Actinopterygii
- Order: Clupeiformes
- Family: Engraulidae
- Genus: Stolephorus
- Species: S. carpentariae

Binomial name
- Stolephorus carpentariae (De Vis, 1882)

Synonyms
- Engraulis carpentariae De Vis, 1882

Species of fish

Stolephorus carpentariae, the Gulf of Carpentaria anchovy, is a species of ray-finned fish in the family Engraulidae. It is found in the western Pacific Ocean.

== Size ==
This species reaches a maximum length of 5.0 cm (2.0 in).
