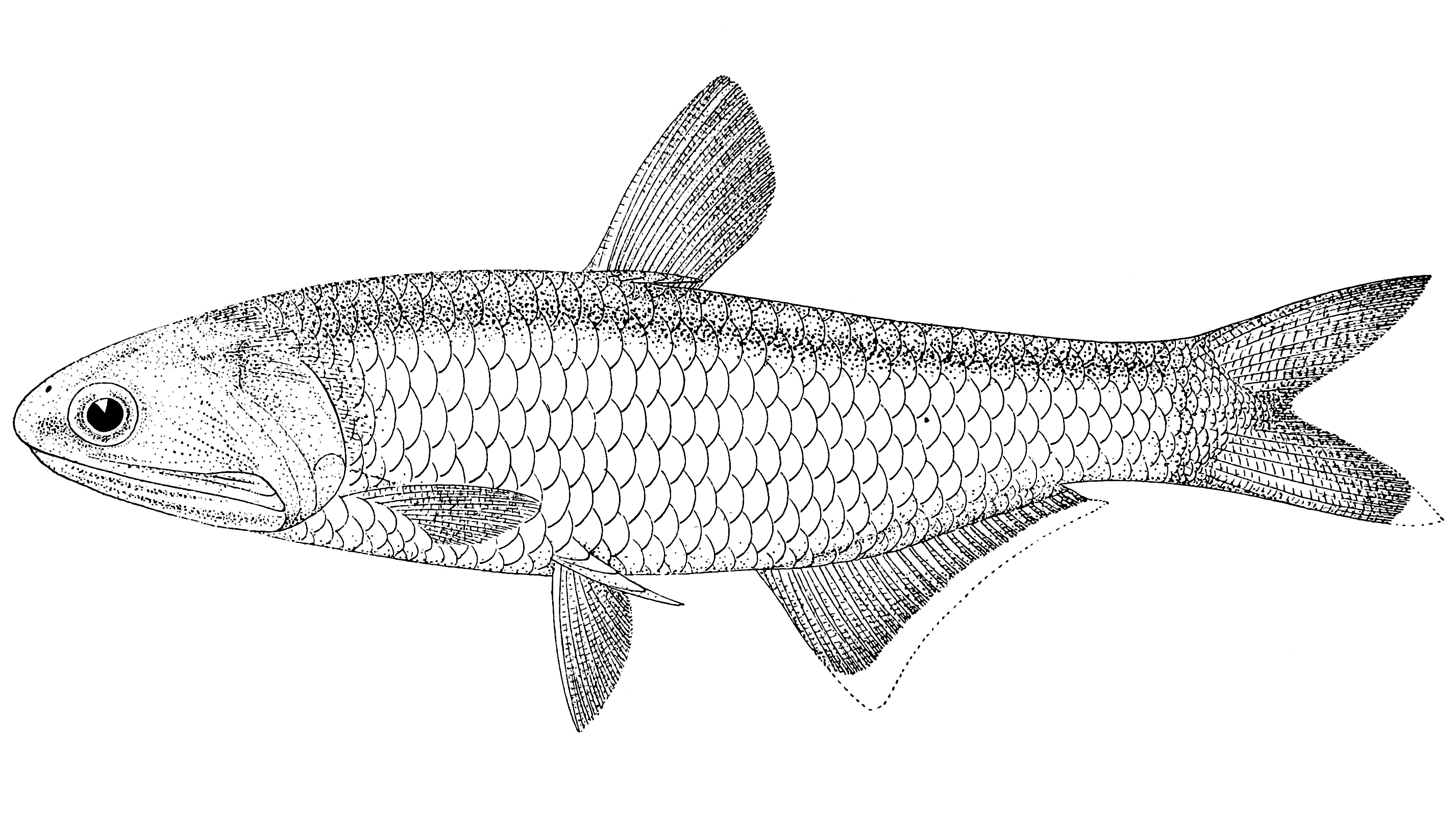

Conservation status
- Data Deficient (IUCN 3.1)

Scientific classification
- Kingdom: Animalia
- Phylum: Chordata
- Class: Actinopterygii
- Order: Clupeiformes
- Family: Engraulidae
- Genus: Thryssa
- Species: T. encrasicholoides

Binomial name
- Thryssa encrasicholoides (Bleeker, 1852)

Synonyms
- Anchoa duodecim (Cope, 1867); Engraulis duodecim Cope, 1867; Engraulis encrasicholoides Bleeker, 1852; Thrissina encrasicholoides (Bleeker, 1852)

= Thryssa encrasicholoides =

False baelama anchovy

Species of ray-finned fish

Thryssa encrasicholoides, the false baelama anchovy or New Jersey anchovy, is a species of ray-finned fish in the family Engraulidae. It is found in the all marine, brackish and freshwater systems. It is closely related to Thryssa baelama, where the three different only by small structural aspects such as more caudal vertebrae and one or two keeled scutes without arms.

== Description ==
It is a small schooling fish found in depth of 20–50 m (66–164 ft). Maximum length do not exceed 10.7 cm (4.2 in). The fish lack dorsal soft rays and only present 24 to 28 anal soft rays.

== Distribution ==
Spreads all along the Indo-Pacific oceans from India, Sri Lanka, to Indonesia, the Philippines and northern Australia.

== See also ==
- List of common commercial fish of Sri Lanka
