= Stolephorus dubiosus =

Thai anchovy

Conservation status
- Least Concern (IUCN 3.1)

Scientific classification
- Kingdom: Animalia
- Phylum: Chordata
- Class: Actinopterygii
- Order: Clupeiformes
- Family: Engraulidae
- Genus: Stolephorus
- Species: S. dubiosus

Binomial name
- Stolephorus dubiosus Wongratana, 1987

Species of fish

Stolephorus dubiosus, the Thai anchovy, is a species of ray-finned fish in the family Engraulidae. It is found in the western-central Pacific Ocean.

== Size ==
This species reaches a length of 7.5 cm (3.0 in).
