= Stolephorus ronquilloi =

Ronquillo's anchovy

Conservation status
- Data Deficient (IUCN 3.1)

Scientific classification
- Kingdom: Animalia
- Phylum: Chordata
- Class: Actinopterygii
- Order: Clupeiformes
- Family: Engraulidae
- Genus: Stolephorus
- Species: S. ronquilloi

Binomial name
- Stolephorus ronquilloi Wongratana, 1983

Species of fish

Stolephorus ronquilloi, the Ronquillo's anchovy, is a species of ray-finned fish in the family Engraulidae. It is found in the western-central Pacific Ocean.

== Size ==
This species reaches a length of 5.3 cm (2.1 in).

== Etymology ==
The fish is named in honor of the Filipino marine biologist, Inocencio Aricayos Ronquillo (1918–?), who collected the type specimen and whose studies of Stolephorus led the way for the author, Wongratana.
