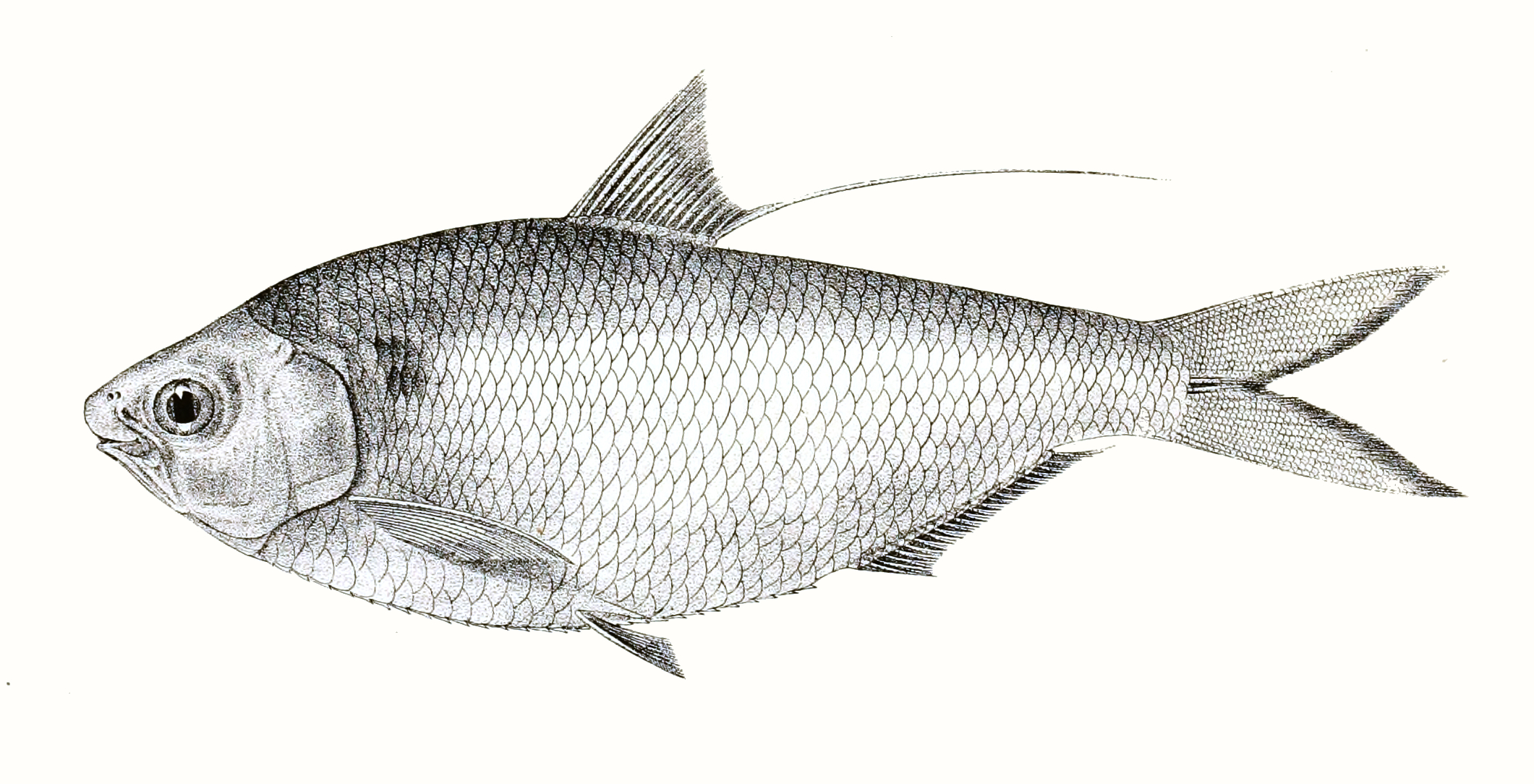
- Nematalosa nasus
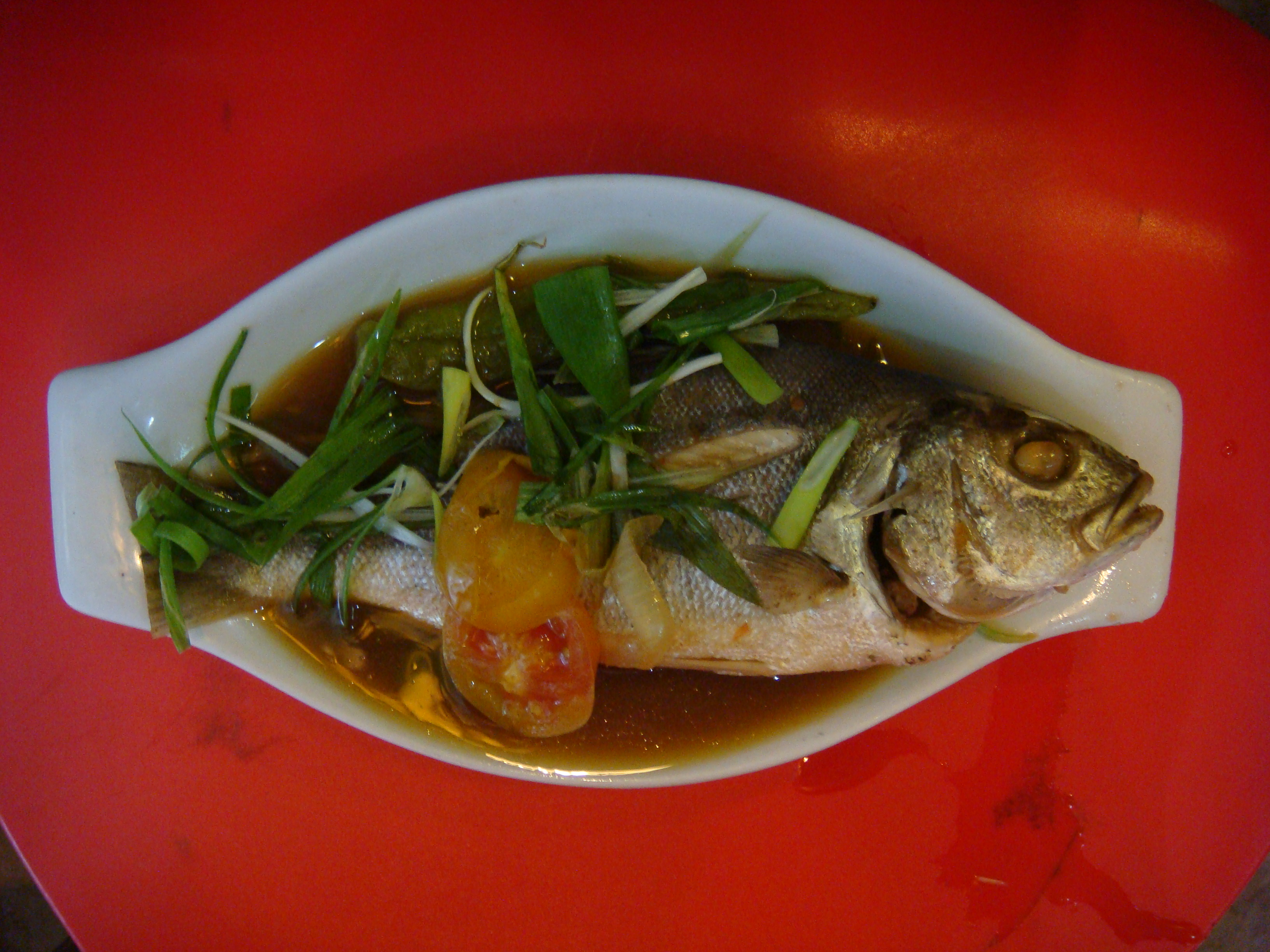
- Nematalosa come

Scientific classification
- Kingdom: Animalia
- Phylum: Chordata
- Class: Actinopterygii
- Order: Clupeiformes
- Family: Dorosomatidae
- Genus: Nematalosa; Regan, 1917

Type species
- Clupea nasus Bloch, 1795

= Nematalosa =

Genus of fishes

Nematalosa is a genus of gizzard shads in the fish family Dorosomatidae. There are currently 11 recognized species. They are mainly found in Indo-Pacific.

== Species ==
- Nematalosa arabica Regan, 1917 (Arabian gizzard shad)
- Nematalosa come (J. Richardson, 1846) (Western Pacific gizzard shad)
- Nematalosa erebi (Günther, 1868) (Australian river gizzard shad)
- Nematalosa flyensis Wongratana, 1983 (Fly River gizzard shad)
- Nematalosa galatheae G. J. Nelson & Rothman, 1973 (Galathea gizzard shad)
- Nematalosa japonica Regan, 1917 (Japanese gizzard shad)
- Nematalosa nasus (Bloch, 1795) (Bloch's gizzard shad)
- Nematalosa papuensis (Munro, 1964) (Strickland River gizzard shad)
- Nematalosa persara G. J. Nelson & McCarthy, 1995
- Nematalosa resticularia G. J. Nelson & McCarthy, 1995
- Nematalosa vlaminghi (Munro, 1956) (Western Australian gizzard shad)
