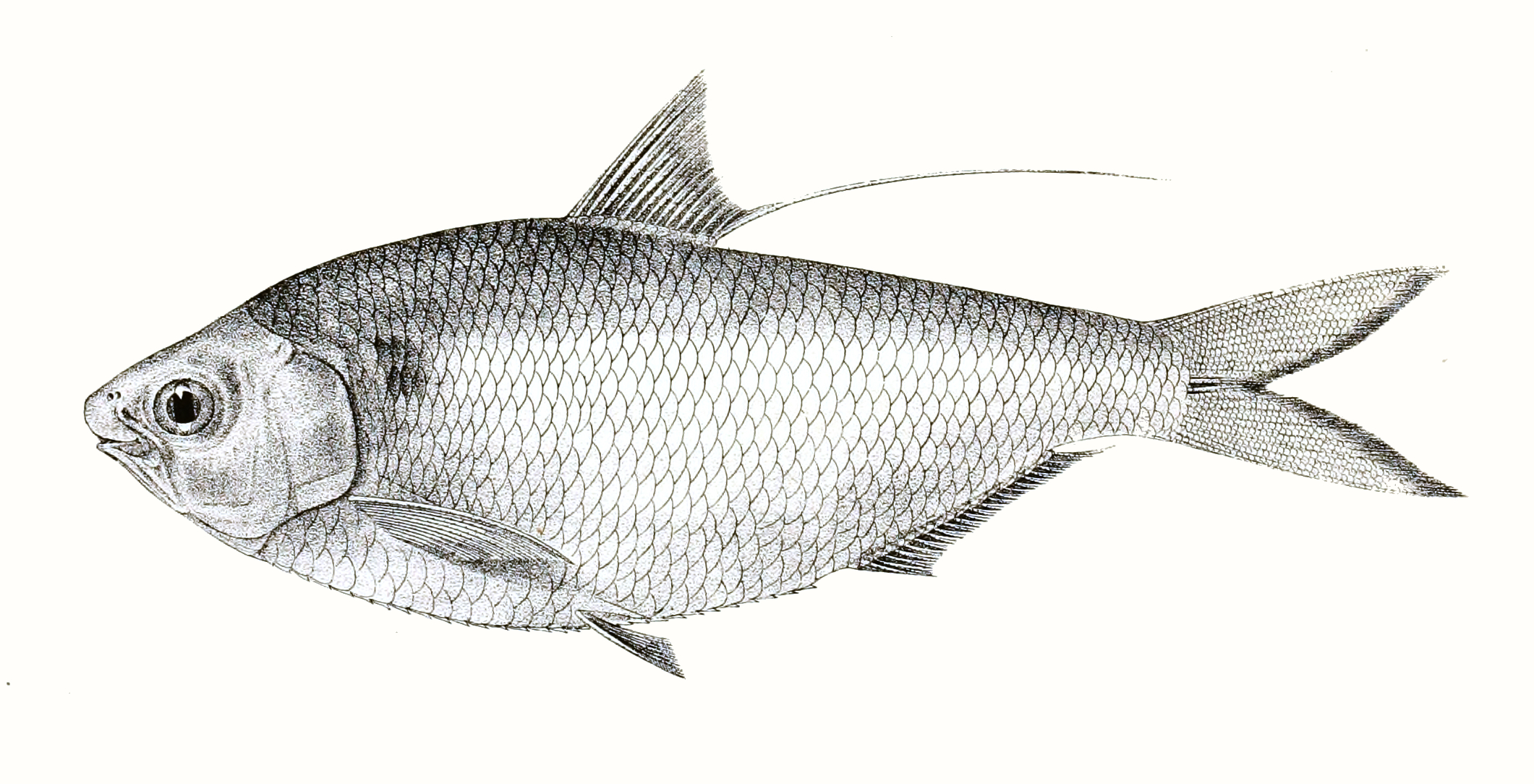

Conservation status
- Least Concern (IUCN 3.1)

Scientific classification
- Kingdom: Animalia
- Phylum: Chordata
- Class: Actinopterygii
- Order: Clupeiformes
- Family: Dorosomatidae
- Genus: Nematalosa
- Species: N. nasus

Binomial name
- Nematalosa nasus (Bloch, 1795)

Synonyms
- Clupea nasus Bloch, 1795; Chatoessus nasus (Bloch, 1795); Dorosoma nasus (Bloch, 1795); Nematalosus nasus (Bloch, 1795); Nematalosa nasus (Bloch, 1795); Clupanodon nasica Lacepède, 1803; Chatoessus altus Gray, 1834; Chatoessus chrysopterus Richardson, 1846

= Nematalosa nasus =

Species of fish

The Bloch's gizzard shad (Nematalosa nasus), also known as gizzard shad, hairback, long-finned gizzard shad, long-ray bony bream and thread-finned gizzard shad, is a widespread and common, small to medium-sized anadromous fish found in all marine, freshwater and brackish waters throughout the Indo-West Pacific, from the Andaman Sea, South China Sea and the Philippines to the Korean peninsula. A single specimen was recorded from waters of South Africa. It was described by Marcus Elieser Bloch in 1795.

The sardines are known to swim at a maximum depth of 30 metres. The largest known standard length for the species is 22 cm. The fish can be distinguished from its sister species by the presence of a dark spot behind gill opening. Belly consists with 17 to 20and 9 to 13 scutes. It has 15 to 19 dorsal soft rays and 17 to 26 anal dorsal soft rays. It is a filter feeder and feeds on planktons. Widely used as a food fish, it can be made into fish balls and can be eaten both in fresh and dried forms.

== See also ==
- Commercial fish of Sri Lanka
