= Stolephorus teguhi =

Sulawesi anchovy

Conservation status
- Data Deficient (IUCN 3.1)

Scientific classification
- Kingdom: Animalia
- Phylum: Chordata
- Class: Actinopterygii
- Order: Clupeiformes
- Family: Engraulidae
- Genus: Stolephorus
- Species: S. teguhi

Binomial name
- Stolephorus teguhi Seishi Kimura, K. Hori & Shibukawa, 2009

Species of fish

Stolephorus teguhi, the Sulawesi anchovy, is a species of ray-finned fish in the family Engraulidae. It is found in the western-central Pacific Ocean.

== Size ==
This species reaches a length of 7.7 cm (3.0 in).

== Etymology ==
The fish is named in honor of Teguh Peristiwady, the Senior Scientist of the Technical Implementation Unit for Natural Biota Conservation, at the Indonesian Institute of Sciences, for giving the authors the chance to collect specimens.
