= Stolephorus pacificus =

Pacific anchovy

Conservation status
- Data Deficient (IUCN 3.1)

Scientific classification
- Kingdom: Animalia
- Phylum: Chordata
- Class: Actinopterygii
- Order: Clupeiformes
- Family: Engraulidae
- Genus: Stolephorus
- Species: S. pacificus

Binomial name
- Stolephorus pacificus W. J. Baldwin, 1984

Species of fish

Stolephorus pacificus, the Pacific anchovy, is a species of ray-finned fish in the family Engraulidae. It is found in the western-central Pacific Ocean.

== Size ==
This species reaches a length of 7.7 cm (3.0 in).
