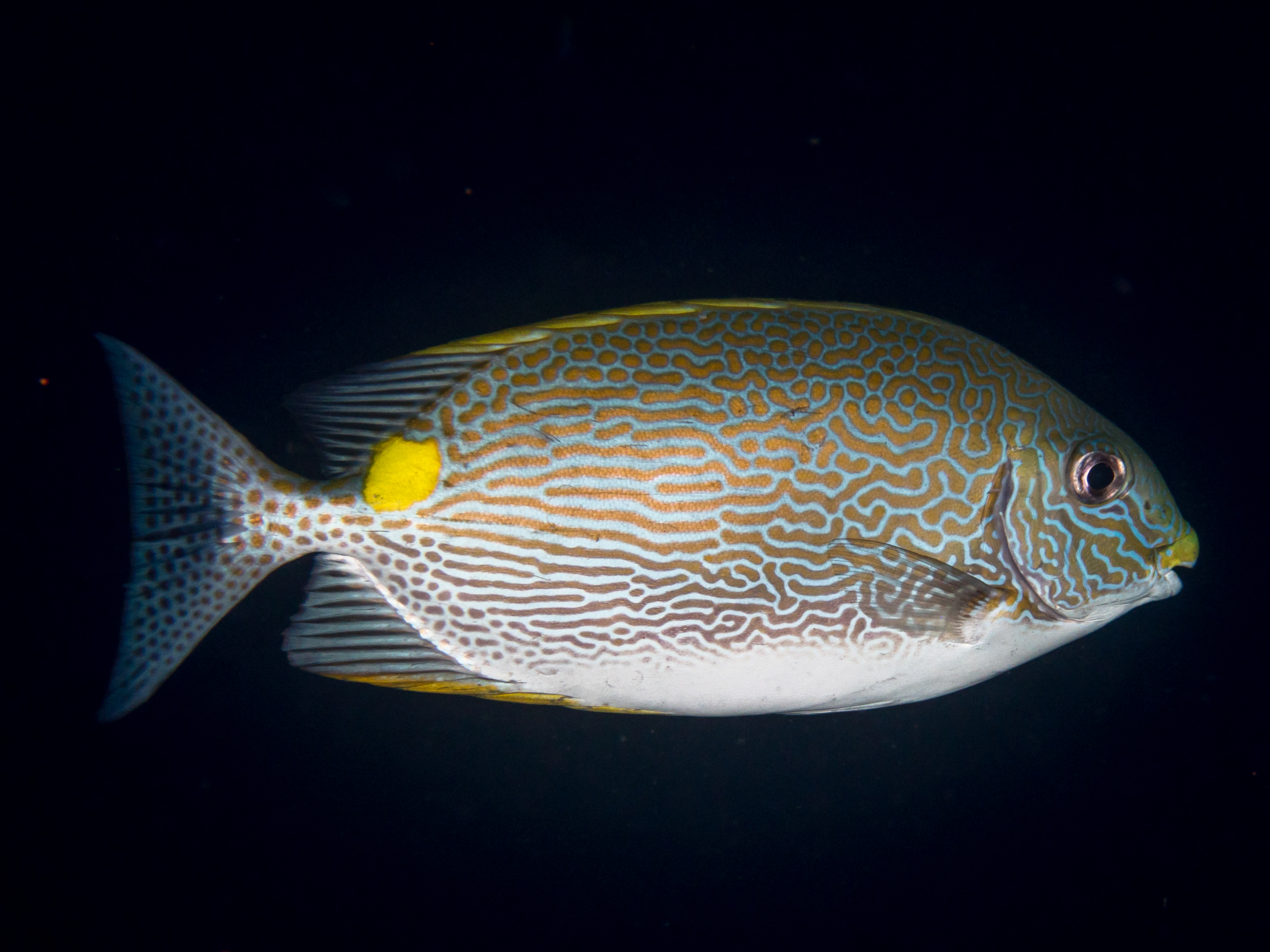

Conservation status
- Least Concern (IUCN 3.1)

Scientific classification
- Kingdom: Animalia
- Phylum: Chordata
- Class: Actinopterygii
- Order: Acanthuriformes
- Family: Siganidae
- Genus: Siganus
- Species: S. lineatus

Binomial name
- Siganus lineatus Valenciennes, 1835

Synonyms=
- Amphacanthus lineatus Valenciennes, 1835; Teuthis lineata (Valenciennes, 1835); Teuthis flava De Vis, 1884; Siganus aurolineatus Ogilby, 1912

= Golden-lined spinefoot =

Species of fish

The golden-lined spinefoot (Siganus lineatus), also known as the goldlined rabbitfish or lined rabbitfish, is a species of marine ray-finned fish, a rabbitfish belonging to the family Siganidae. It is found in the tropical Western Pacific and along the coasts of northern Australia.

== Taxonomy ==
The golden-lined spinefoot was first formally described in 1835 as Amphacanthus lineatus by the French zoologist Achille Valenciennes with the type locality given as the Western Pacific. The populations of spinefoots similar to Siganus lineatus in the waters off the Maldives, southern India and Sr Lanka had been considered to be conspecific with S. lineatus but differences in the colour and pattern as well as genetic differences showed that this was a valid, allopatric species, S. insomnis. The specific name lineatus means "lined", a reference to the wavy bands along its body.

== Description ==
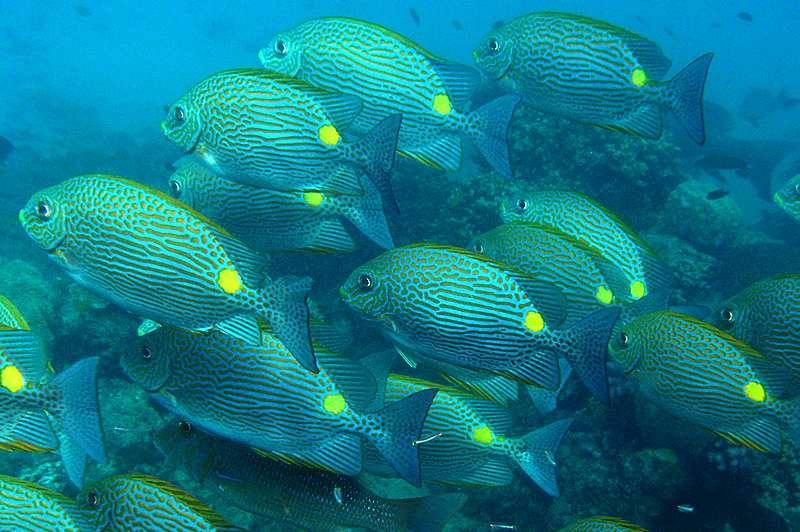
In Queensland, Australia

The golden-lined spinefoot has a laterally compressed body, which has a depth that is just over half its standard length. The dorsal profile of the head is steep and there is a slight indentation above the eyes. The front nostril has a low rim which is larger to the rear. There is a forward pointing spine in front of the dorsal fin which is embedded in the nape. Like all rabbitfishes, the dorsal fin has 13 spines and 10 soft rays while the anal fin has 7 spines and 9 soft rays. The caudal fin is emarginate to weakly forked. This species attains a maximum total length of 43 cm (17 in), although 25 cm (9.8 in) is more typical. The overall colour is pale grey to bluish-grey, shading to silvery on the abdomen, marked with wavy orange lines. There is a large bright yellow spot underneath the soft rayed part of the dorsal fin, and blue lines on the cheek and operculum. The spines in the dorsal fin are golden with dusky bronze membranes while the rays are silvery with bluish membranes between them and there is a golden spot at the base of each ray. The spines of the anal fin are golden bronze with dusky blue membranes and the anal fin rays are bluish with their membranes being dusky, again with a golden spot at the base of each one and a bar at the bottom of it in each cell of the membrane. The caudal fin is bluish with rows of golden spots which look like 3 or 4 cross bars when the fin is furled. The outer spines of the pelvic fin, and the outermost fin ray, are silvery, the rest are dusky blue. The pectoral fins are hyaline.

== Distribution and habitat ==
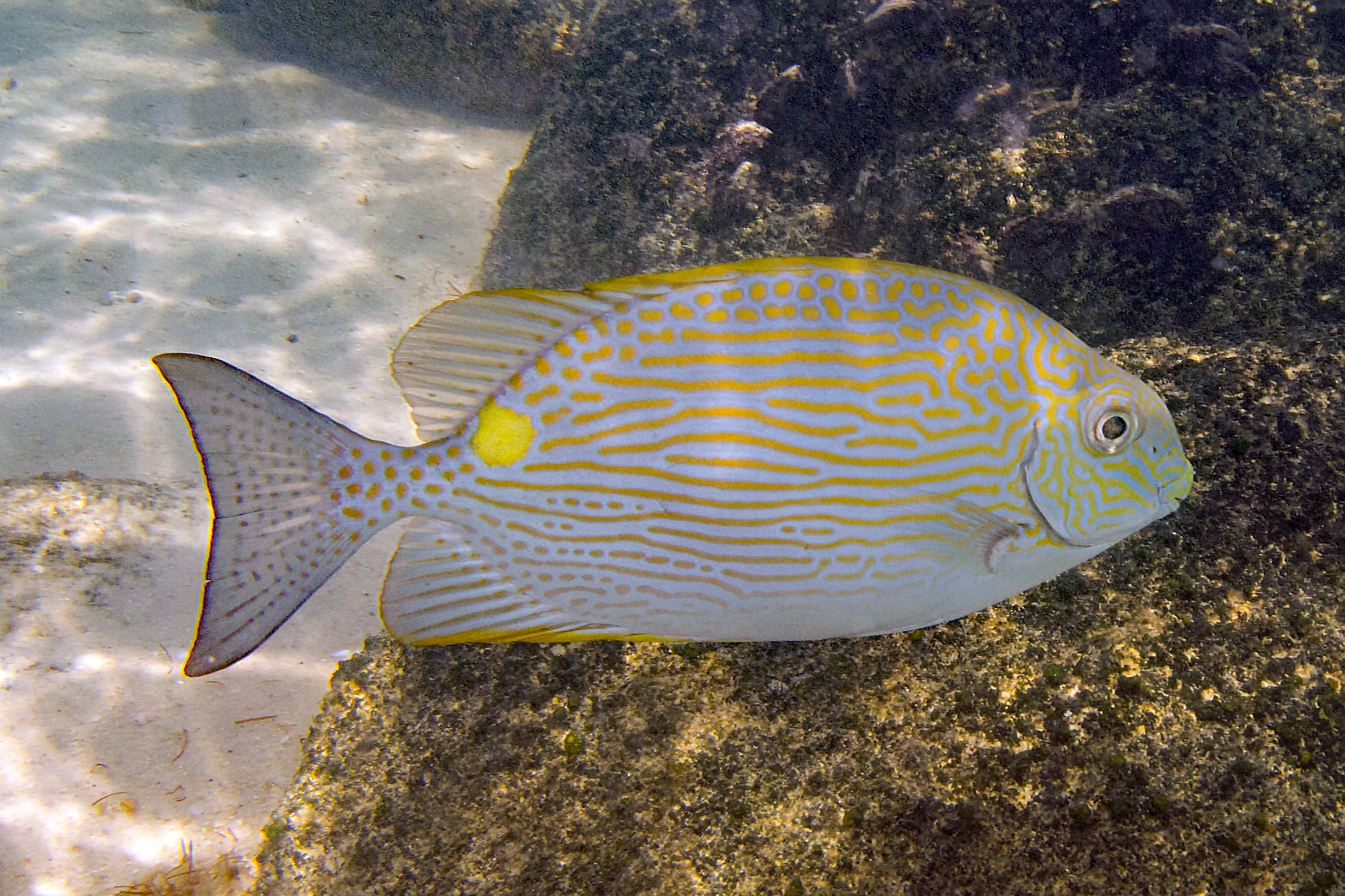
In Queensland, Australia

The golden-lined spinefoot is found in the Indo-West Pacific from the Gulf of Thailand and the Philippines east to Vanuatu and south to northern Australia.

In Australia it has been recorded from Point Quobba in Western Australia east along the northern tropical coast to the Capricorn Group in southern Queensland, as well as at Ashmore Reef in the Timor Sea and Murray Island in the Coral Sea. It has also been reported from the Ogasawara, Europic and Caroline Islands. It has been found as deep as 25 m (82 ft) in sheltered waters like lagoons and bays where they can be found near rocky substrates or reefs, often resting on rubble or sandy bottoms. Juveniles prefer estuaries.

== Biology ==
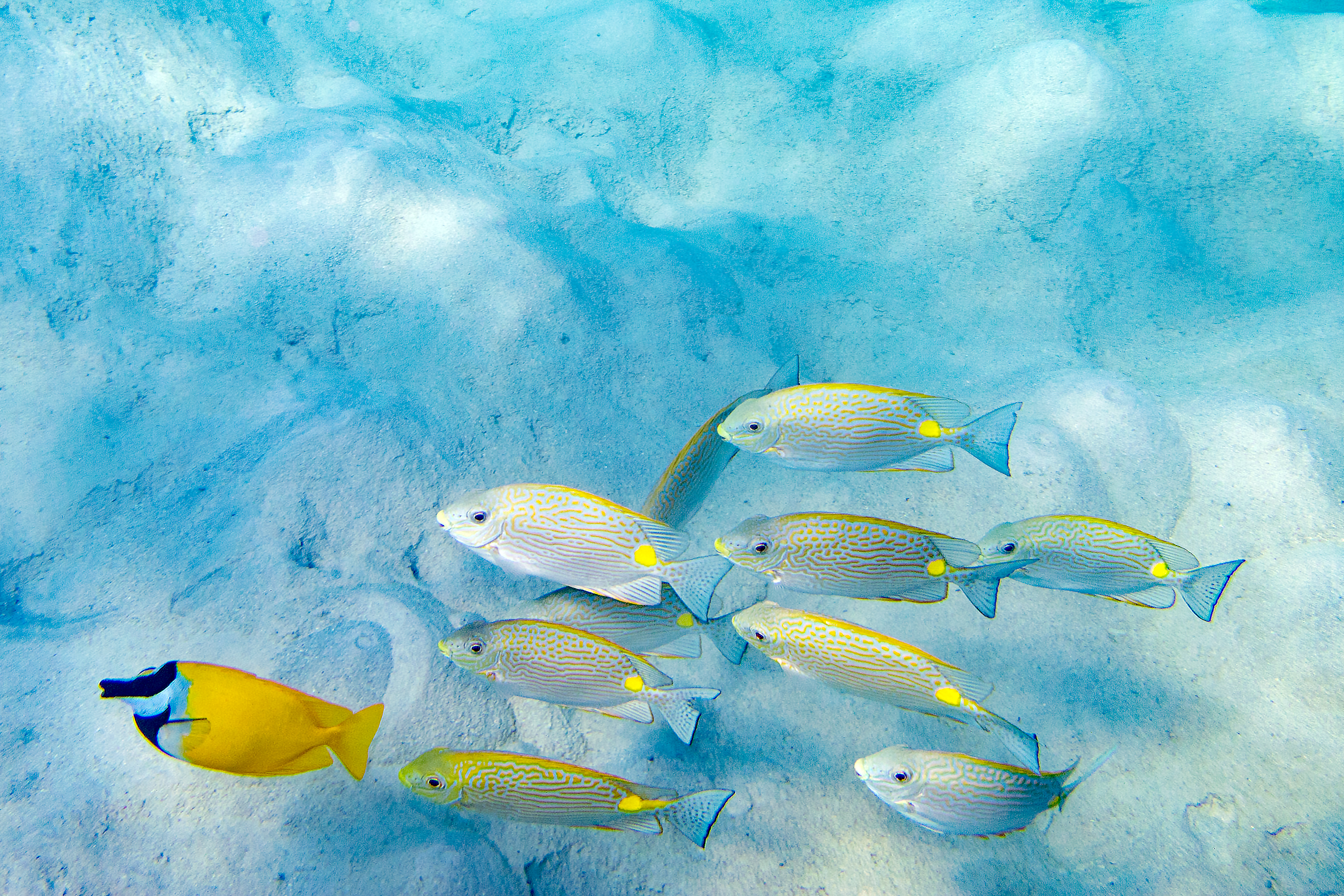
Schooling with a foxface rabbitfish, at Queensland

Golden-lined spinefoots form schools which decrease in size with the age of the fish and range from 10 to 25 fish in the adults, although they may from aggregations of several thousand fish when spawning. They feed on encrusting algae which they scrape off from beach rock or pavement areas of coral reefs, and on larger leafy algae. This species produces venom in the spines of its fins. In a study of the venom of a congener it was found that rabbitfish venom was similar to the venom of stonefishes.

== Fisheries ==
The golden-lined spinefoot is largely caught with set nets and fixed traps, and is commonly sold in fish markets as fresh fish.
