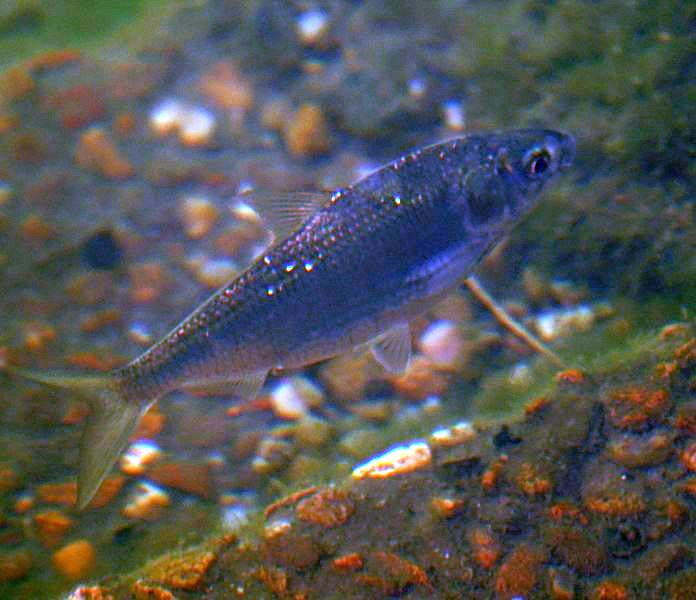

Scientific classification
- Kingdom: Animalia
- Phylum: Chordata
- Class: Actinopterygii
- Division: Teleostei
- Order: Clupeiformes
- Family: Dorosomatidae
- Genus: Nematalosa
- Species: N. erebi

Binomial name
- Nematalosa erebi (Günther, 1868)

Synonyms
- Fluvialosa richardsoni

= Bony bream =

Species of fish

Bony bream (Nematalosa erebi) are a widespread and common, small to medium-sized Australian freshwater fish often found in large shoals throughout much of northern and central Australia, and the Murray-Darling basin.

== Description ==
A deep bodied, laterally compressed fish with a blunt snout. Spineless dorsal fin with the posterior ray developed into a long filament. Usually silver overall, sometimes grey to greenish dorsally. In Victoria it has been reported to develop a rusty red tinge especially around the mouth which is thought to be related to breeding. Some populations develop a dark blotch on the shoulder.

== Distribution ==
Common and widespread throughout its range, found in the Pilbara, Timor Sea, Gulf of Carpentaria, Northeast Coast, Murray-Darling (at elevations below 200 metres, 650 ft) Are present in Tinaroo Dam, elevation 660m, often referred to as "Barra lollies" because of a tendency for impoundment barramundi to round them up and Lake Eyre Australian drainage divisions. Tends to forms large shoals near the bottom.

== Habitat ==
Variable, but mostly in shallow areas of slow flowing or still rivers and streams, especially in turbid conditions; desert bores; and, fresh or saline lakes (up to almost sea water salinity). Can tolerate water temperatures between 9° and 38 °C and a pH between 4.8 and 8.6. Despite these wide tolerances, bony bream are susceptible to low oxygen levels and are often the first species to succumb when ephemeral habitats begin to dry up.

== Diet ==
Primarily feeds on benthic algae but also consumes detritus and small invertebrates.
