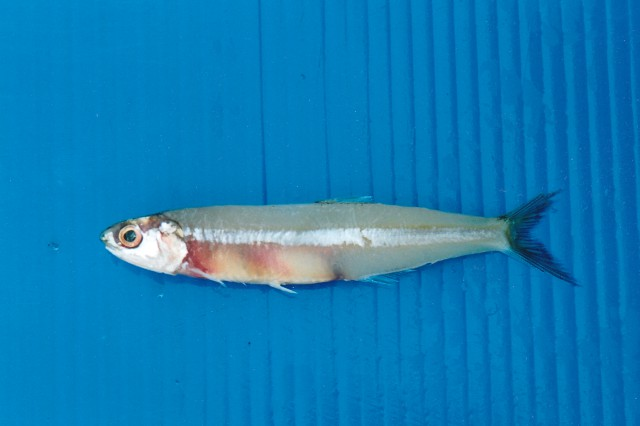

Conservation status
- Least Concern (IUCN 3.1)

Scientific classification
- Kingdom: Animalia
- Phylum: Chordata
- Class: Actinopterygii
- Order: Clupeiformes
- Family: Engraulidae
- Genus: Stolephorus
- Species: S. indicus

Binomial name
- Stolephorus indicus (van Hasselt, 1823)

Synonyms
- List: Engraulis indicus van Hasselt, 1823; Anchoviella indica (van Hasselt, 1823); Anchoviella indicus (van Hasselt, 1823); Engraulis indica van Hasselt, 1823; Engraulis russellii Bleeker, 1821; Engraulis albus Swainson, 1839; Engraulis balinensis Bleeker, 1849; Engraulis samaminan Montrouzier, 1857; Anchoviella scitula Fowler, 1911; Stolephorus extensus Jordan & Seale, 1926; Stolephorus insularum Jordan & Seale, 1926; Stolephorus indicus nanus Hardenberg, 1933; Engraulis brownii (non Gmelin, 1789); Engraulis carpenteriae (non De Vis, 1882); Stolephorus insularis (non Hardenberg, 1933)

= Indian anchovy =

Species of ray-finned fish

The Indian anchovy (Stolephorus indicus), also known as Hardenberg's anchovy, is a species of oceanodromous ray-finned fish in the family Engraulidae. In Sri Lanka, it is widely sold at most markets and supermarkets. It is also used as a live or dead bait in the tuna fishery.

== Description ==
The maximum length does not exceed 15.5 cm (6.1 in). It has 15 to 17 dorsal soft rays and 18 to 21 anal soft rays. There are 2 to 6 small needle-like scutes on the belly region. The maxilla tip is pointed, reaching the front border of pre-operculum. The body is a typical engraulid form with light transparent fleshy brown, and silver stripe down flank. Indian anchovies usually feed on plankton.

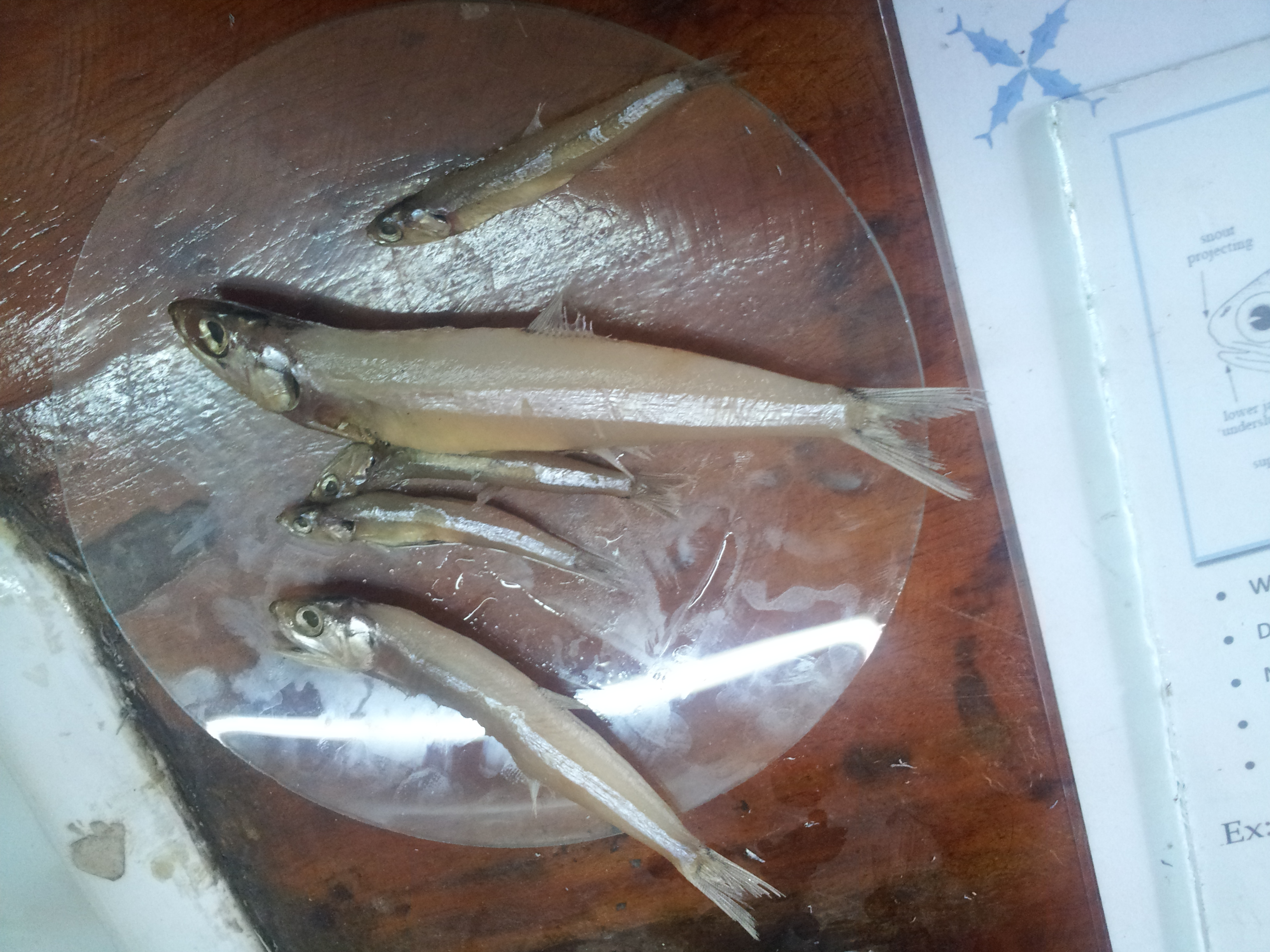
Stolephorus indicus (larger specimens) with Commerson's anchovy (smaller specimens) in a lab

== Distribution and habitat ==
The Indian anchovy is a small schooling fish found at a depth of 20-50m in most of the tropical areas of the Indo-Pacific ocean from Madagascar and Mauritius eastward to Australia and further east to Samoa westwards. Recently recorded for the first time in the Mediterranean Sea (off Palestine, 2015), it probably migrated via the Suez Canal. It is likely present in adjacent countries but overlooked in the Mediterranean due to its external resemblance to other engraulids in the region.

== Uses ==
This fish is part of the cuisine of the Indian and Southeast Asian marine regions. It can be crisp-fried, cooked in curries, or used to make fish-based culinary products like fish sauce. In Sri Lanka, this variety of fish is made into a tasty snack by dipping in a batter of flour, then rolled in bread crumbs and deep fried in oil. It is also popular as a 'white curry', a curry made with coconut milk. A spicier variant is made with dry chilli gravy and served with scraped fresh coconut to offset the hotness of the gravy.

== See also ==
- List of fish in India
- List of marine bony fishes of South Africa
- Fish of the Red Sea
- List of common commercial fish of Sri Lanka
