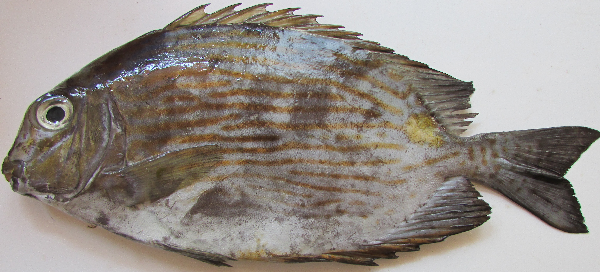
- Specimen caught near Tuticorin, India

Conservation status
- Least Concern (IUCN 3.1)

Scientific classification
- Kingdom: Animalia
- Phylum: Chordata
- Class: Actinopterygii
- Order: Acanthuriformes
- Family: Siganidae
- Genus: Siganus
- Species: S. insomnis

Binomial name
- Siganus insomnis Woodland & R. C. Anderson, 2014

= Siganus insomnis =

Species of rabbitfish

Siganus insomnis, the bronze-lined spinefoot, is a species of marine ray-finned fish, a rabbitfish belonging to the family Siganidae. It is found in the northern central Indian Ocean. It had formerly been confused with S. lineatus, but was recognized as a separate species in 2014.

== Taxonomy ==
Siganus insomnis was first formally described in 2014 by David J. Woodland and R. Charles Anderson with the type locality given as Addu Atoll, Feydhoo Island in the Maldives. The populations of spinefoots similar to Siganus lineatus in the waters off the Maldives, southern India and Sri Lanka had been considered to be conspecific with S. lineatus but differences in the colour and pattern as well as genetic differences showed that this was a valid, allopatric species. The specific name insomnis means "sleepless", a reference to its preference for nocturnal feeding.

== Description ==
Siganus insomnis is a deep-bodied species of rabbitfish which is told apart from other rabbitfishes by having the flanks (apart from possibly the belly and a narrow strip along the base of the spiny part of the dorsal fin) marked with horizontal, parallel bronze coloured lines which extend the whole length of the flank from the nape and gill slit to underneath the large yellow spot below the base of the soft rayed part of the dorsal fin. Most of these lines on the flanks are uninterrupted for the whole of their length. There may be a row of bronze spots along the base of the spiny part of the dorsal fin. Like all rabbitfish, this species has 13 spines and 10 soft rays in the dorsal fin while the anal fin has 7 spines and 9 soft rays. In small juveniles the caudal fin is emarginate but as the fish grows it becomes more forked. This species attains a maximum total length of 35 cm (14 in).

== Distribution and habitat ==
Siganus insomnis is found in the northern central Indian Ocean in the Maldives, southern India and Sri Lanka. Adults are normally found on coral or sandstone reefs, as well as beds of sea grass. The juveniles live in large estuaries. Estuaries are important habitats for the younger fishes who move onto reefs when they mature.

== Biology ==
Siganus insomnis lives in schools as adults. They are largely herbivores that scrape algae from rock and coral substrates as well as browsing on seaweeds and sea grasses. It likely also eats small amounts of animal matter. Analyses of intestinal contents of specimens with standard lengths between 2 and 27 cm (0.79 and 10.63 in) collected from lagoons and coastal areas of Sri Lanka showed they had consumed diatoms, green, blue-green, red and brown algae and a seagrass. This species appears to prefer feeding at night, and was apparently mostly inactive in the day.

== Fisheries ==
Siganus insomnis is fished for using gillnets and hand line in the Maldives and is also spearfished at night. It is also part of a major fishery in Sri Lanka.
