= Nematalosa flyensis =

Conservation status
- Data Deficient (IUCN 3.1)

Scientific classification
- Kingdom: Animalia
- Phylum: Chordata
- Class: Actinopterygii
- Order: Clupeiformes
- Family: Dorosomatidae
- Genus: Nematalosa
- Species: N. flyensis

Binomial name
- Nematalosa flyensis Wongratana, 1983

Species of fish

Nematalosa flyensis, the Fly River gizzard or Fly River gizzard shad, is a species of freshwater ray-finned fish within the family Clupeidae. The species is endemic to New Guinea, and is only known to inhabit the Fly River, including its tributary Strickland River.

== Biology ==
Nematalosa flyensis inhabits rivers and floodplains at depths down to 50 meters, but is not known if it also inhabits estuaries. Individuals are known to grow as big as 22.2 cm (8.7 in) in standard length.

== Conservation ==
Nematalosa flyensis has been classified as 'Data deficient' by the IUCN Red List. Little is known about the population and threats of the species, and since its endemic to a single river system it could be susceptible to degradation, droughts, algal blooms and fishing, although whether these greatly impact the species is unknown. No conservation efforts have been made so far.
